= National Register of Historic Places listings in Cochise County, Arizona =

Location of Cochise County in Arizona

This is a list of the National Register of Historic Places listings in Cochise County, Arizona. It is intended to be a complete list of the properties and districts on the National Register of Historic Places in Cochise County, Arizona, United States. The locations of National Register properties and districts for which the latitude and longitude coordinates are included below, may be seen in a map.

There are 87 properties and districts listed on the National Register in the county, including 8 that are also National Historic Landmarks.

This National Park Service list is complete through NPS recent listings posted April 24, 2026.

== Listings county-wide ==
	Name on the Register	Image	Date listed	Location	City or town	Description
1	Apache Powder Historic Residential District	Apache Powder Historic Residential District	March 11, 1994 (#94000078)	100 and 200 blocks of W. 6th St. 31°58′01″N 110°17′59″W	Benson	
2	Barfoot Lookout Complex	Barfoot Lookout Complex	January 28, 1988 (#87002463)	Buena Vista Peak; 31°54′59″N 109°16′23″W	Portal	Constructed by the CCC in 1935, Barfoot Lookout on the Coronado National Forest in Arizona was active for more than 65 years. It was a 14’x 14’ L-4 ground house with a roof-catch cistern once common in the dry Southwestern forests. This lookout was destroyed in the Horseshoe II fire in June 2011. Only the foundation remains.
3	Bear Spring House, Guardhouse, and Spring	Bear Spring House, Guardhouse, and Spring	March 18, 1983 (#83002985)	South of Bowie off Apache Pass Rd. 32°08′22″N 109°25′34″W	Bowie	
4	Benson Railroad Historic District	Benson Railroad Historic District	March 11, 1994 (#94000079)	200 and 300 blocks of E. 3rd St. 31°58′10″N 110°17′41″W	Benson	
5	Benson Historic Barrio	Benson Historic Barrio	April 8, 2011 (#11000174)	307-572 E. Fifth St., between San Pedro St. and Route 80; 31°57′59″N 110°17′33″W	Benson	
6	Bisbee Historic District	Bisbee Historic District	July 3, 1980 (#80004487)	off U.S. Route 80 (Note: US 80 was removed from Arizona in 1989, the road is now State Route 80.); 31°26′34″N 109°54′50″W	Bisbee	
7	Bisbee Residential Historic District	Bisbee Residential Historic District	October 15, 2010 (#10000233)	Roughly bounded by the City of Bisbee city limits north of Lavender Pit Mine, excluding existing Bisbee Historic District; 31°26′38″N 109°55′26″W	Bisbee	
8	Bisbee Woman's Club Clubhouse	Bisbee Woman's Club Clubhouse	January 31, 1985 (#85000145)	74 Quality Hill; 31°26′32″N 109°55′12″W	Bisbee	
9	Benjamin E. Briscoe House	Benjamin E. Briscoe House	May 27, 1987 (#87000737)	358 N. Bowie; 32°15′28″N 109°50′21″W	Willcox	
10	Bowie School District No. 14	Bowie School District No. 14	April 28, 2015 (#15000168)	315 W. 5th St. 32°19′33″N 109°29′26″W	Bowie	
11	Camp Naco Historic District	Camp Naco Historic District	October 17, 2012 (#12000853)	Junction of Willson Rd. & Newell St. 31°20′24″N 109°57′10″W	Naco	
12	Chiricahua National Monument Historic Designed Landscape	Chiricahua National Monument Historic Designed Landscape	November 21, 2008 (#08001020)	12856 E. Rhyolite Canyon Rd. 32°00′20″N 109°21′24″W	Willcox	Encompasses improved portions of the National Monument.
13	Cima Park Fire Guard Station		June 10, 1993 (#93000514)	In the Chiricahua Wilderness northeast of Douglas in Coronado National Forest; 31°51′41″N 109°16′55″W	Douglas	
14	Cochise Hotel	Cochise Hotel	October 22, 1976 (#76000370)	Off U.S. Route 666 (Note: Renumbered to U.S. Route 191 in 1992.); 32°06′17″N 109°55′20″W	Cochise	
15	Coronado National Memorial	Coronado National Memorial	October 15, 1966 (#66000168)	30 miles (48 km) southwest of Bisbee; 31°20′48″N 110°15′12″W	Hereford	
16	Council Rocks Archaeological District	Council Rocks Archaeological District	January 16, 1987 (#86003666)	Address Restricted	St. David	
17	Crowley House	Crowley House	August 6, 1987 (#87000748)	175 S. Railroad Ave. 32°15′02″N 109°49′51″W	Willcox	
18	Double Adobe Site	Double Adobe Site	October 15, 1966 (#66000169)	Address Restricted	Douglas	
19	Douglas Historic District	Douglas Historic District	January 31, 1985 (#85000146)	Roughly bounded by Pan American, H, and F Aves. along 8th, 10th, 11th, 12th, and 13th Sts. and G Ave. 31°20′43″N 109°33′13″W	Douglas	
20	Douglas Municipal Airport	Douglas Municipal Airport	December 30, 1975 (#75000336)	Eastern end of 10th Ave. 31°20′32″N 109°30′19″W	Douglas	
21	Douglas Residential Historic District	Douglas Residential Historic District	July 31, 1986 (#86002095)	Roughly bounded by 12th St., Carmelita Ave., 7th St., and East Ave. 31°20′40″N 109°32′49″W	Douglas	
22	Douglas Sonoran Historic District	Douglas Sonoran Historic District	August 26, 1987 (#87001793)	Roughly bounded by the western side of H Ave. between 6th and 9th Sts. 31°20′47″N 109°32′30″W	Douglas	
23	Douglas Underpass	Douglas Underpass	September 30, 1988 (#88001609)	U.S. Route 80 under Southern Pacific railroad tracks at milepost 366.1; 31°21′01″N 109°33′17″W	Douglas	Built in 1936 as a part of the Works Projects Administration for historic U.S. 80 under the tracks of the Southern Pacific Railroad; demolished in 1999. It became a national historic site on September 30, 1988.
24	Walter Douglas House	Walter Douglas House	September 22, 2000 (#00001125)	201 Cole Ave. 31°25′05″N 109°52′37″W	Bisbee	Also known as Loma Linda.
25	Dragoon Springs Stage Station Site	Dragoon Springs Stage Station Site	May 7, 1979 (#79000415)	Address Restricted	Dragoon	
26	El Paso and Southwestern Railroad Passenger Depot-Douglas	El Paso and Southwestern Railroad Passenger Depot-Douglas	April 16, 1986 (#86000792)	14th St. and H Ave. 31°20′58″N 109°33′21″W	Douglas	
27	El Paso and Southwestern Railroad YMCA	El Paso and Southwestern Railroad YMCA	March 1, 1984 (#84000647)	1000 Pan American Ave. 31°20′40″N 109°33′24″W	Douglas	
28	Evergreen Cemetery	Evergreen Cemetery	October 7, 2005 (#04001071)	Old Douglas Rd. 31°25′54″N 109°53′26″W	Bisbee	
29	Faraway Ranch Historic District	Faraway Ranch Historic District	August 27, 1980 (#80000368)	State Route 181; 32°00′38″N 109°22′23″W	Dos Cabezas	
30	Fort Bowie National Historic Site	Fort Bowie National Historic Site	July 29, 1972 (#72000194)	12 miles (19 km) south of Bowie; 32°09′24″N 109°27′11″W	Bowie	
31	Fort Huachuca	Fort Huachuca	November 20, 1974 (#74000443)	3.6 miles (5.8 km) west of Sierra Vista; 31°32′59″N 110°21′50″W	Sierra Vista	
32	Fry Pioneer Cemetery	Fry Pioneer Cemetery	January 15, 2009 (#08001312)	Between 6th and 7th Sts., ½ block north of Fry Boulevard; 31°33′22″N 110°17′30″W	Sierra Vista	
33	Gadsden Hotel	Gadsden Hotel	July 30, 1976 (#76000371)	1046 G. Ave. 31°20′43″N 109°33′15″W	Douglas	
34	Garden Canyon Archeological Site		October 29, 1975 (#75000338)	Address Restricted	Sierra Vista	
35	Garden Canyon Petroglyphs	Garden Canyon Petroglyphs	July 30, 1974 (#74000444)	Address Restricted	Fort Huachuca	
36	Geronimo Surrender Site	Geronimo Surrender Site	March 6, 1998 (#98000170)	Bluff overlooking Skeleton Canyon, 45 miles (72 km) northeast of Douglas; 31°35′59″N 109°04′24″W	Douglas	
37	Grand Theatre	Grand Theatre	July 30, 1976 (#76000372)	1139-1149 G. Ave. 31°20′43″N 109°33′35″W	Douglas	
38	John Gung'l House	John Gung'l House	May 27, 1987 (#87000749)	210 S. Austin Blvd. 32°15′10″N 109°50′13″W	Willcox	
39	Hereford Bridge	Hereford Bridge	September 30, 1988 (#88001659)	Hereford Rd. over the San Pedro River; 31°26′18″N 110°06′26″W	Hereford	
40	Hi Wo Company Grocery	Hi Wo Company Grocery	March 11, 1994 (#94000074)	398 E. 4th St. 31°58′03″N 110°17′35″W	Benson	
41	Hooker Town House	Hooker Town House	May 27, 1987 (#87000736)	235 E. Stewart; 32°15′10″N 109°49′45″W	Willcox	
42	Johnson-Tillotson House	Johnson-Tillotson House	August 6, 1987 (#87000743)	124 N. Curtis; 32°15′13″N 109°50′01″W	Willcox	
43	Kinjockity Ranch	Kinjockity Ranch	July 19, 1996 (#96000759)	10047 E. State Route 92; 31°23′12″N 110°13′17″W	Hereford	
44	Lehner Mammoth-Kill Site	Lehner Mammoth-Kill Site	May 28, 1967 (#67000002)	Address Restricted; 31°25′18″N 110°06′53″W	Hereford	
45	W.D. Martinez General Merchandise Store	W.D. Martinez General Merchandise Store	March 11, 1994 (#94000073)	180 San Pedro St. 31°58′01″N 110°17′42″W	Benson	
46	Joe Mee House	Joe Mee House	August 6, 1987 (#87000739)	265 W. Stewart; 32°15′18″N 109°50′02″W	Willcox	
47	Monte Vista Lookout Cabin		January 28, 1988 (#87002468)	Monte Vista Peak; 31°49′30″N 109°18′53″W	Elfrida	
48	Morgan House	Morgan House	August 18, 1987 (#87000746)	242 E. Maley; 32°15′04″N 109°49′47″W	Willcox	
49	Mountain View Officers' Club	Mountain View Officers' Club	January 24, 2017 (#100000549)	Kilbourn Ave. 31°32′45″N 110°20′12″W	Fort Huachuca	1942 built to serve African American officers at Fort Huachuca, which had the highest number of African American soldiers at any military installation in the U.S.
50	Muheim House	Muheim House	January 23, 1979 (#79000414)	207 Youngblood Ave. 31°26′47″N 109°54′45″W	Bisbee	
51	Murray Springs Clovis Site	Murray Springs Clovis Site	October 16, 2012 (#12001019)	T.21 S., R.21 E.; Sec. 26 (portion) East of Moson Rd., San Pedro Riparian National Conservation Area; 31°34′16″N 110°10′53″W	Sierra Vista vicinity	
52	Naco Border Station	Naco Border Station	February 19, 1991 (#91000026)	106 D St. 31°20′05″N 109°56′54″W	Naco	
53	Naco-Mammoth Kill Site	Naco-Mammoth Kill Site	July 21, 1976 (#76002285)	Address Restricted	Naco	First Clovis culture mammoth-kill site found
54	John H. Norton and Company Store	John H. Norton and Company Store	March 31, 1983 (#83002987)	180 N. Railroad Ave. 32°15′11″N 109°49′51″W	Willcox	
55	Oasis Court	Oasis Court	March 11, 1994 (#94000072)	363 W. 4th St. 31°58′09″N 110°18′08″W	Benson	
56	Our Lady of Victory Catholic Church	Our Lady of Victory Catholic Church	July 21, 2004 (#04000718)	Fronting 4th St., between Cedar and Spruce Sts. 31°54′15″N 109°49′19″W	Pearce	
57	Pearce General Store	Pearce General Store	November 16, 1978 (#78000541)	Ghost Town and Pearce Rd. 31°54′16″N 109°49′16″W	Pearce	
58	Phelps Dodge General Office Building	Phelps Dodge General Office Building	June 3, 1971 (#71000109)	Copper Queen Plaza, intersection of Main St. and Brewery Gulch; 31°26′31″N 109°54′41″W	Bisbee	
59	Portal Ranger Station	Portal Ranger Station	June 10, 1993 (#93000517)	Forest Rd. 42A southwest of Portal, Coronado National Forest; 31°53′56″N 109°09′41″W	Portal	
60	Quiburi		April 7, 1971 (#71000110)	Address Restricted	Fairbank	
61	Railroad Avenue Historic District	Railroad Avenue Historic District	May 27, 1987 (#87000751)	Roughly bounded by Curtis Ave., Stewart St., Southern Pacific railroad tracks, and Grant St. 32°15′08″N 109°49′52″W	Willcox	
62	Redfield-Romine House	Redfield-Romine House	March 11, 1994 (#94000076)	146 E. 6th St. 31°57′58″N 110°17′50″W	Benson	
63	Rucker Canyon Archeological District		March 3, 1995 (#95000157)	Address Restricted	Douglas	
64	Rustler Park Fire Guard Station		June 10, 1993 (#93000518)	Southeast of Chiricahua National Monument in Coronado National Forest; 31°54′10″N 109°16′41″W	Douglas	
65	Sacred Heart Church	Sacred Heart Church	February 22, 2002 (#02000032)	592 E. Safford St. 31°42′51″N 110°03′51″W	Tombstone	
66	St. Patrick's Roman Catholic Church	St. Patrick's Roman Catholic Church	September 7, 1995 (#95001080)	Oak Ave., on Higgins Hill; 31°26′40″N 109°55′19″W	Bisbee	
67	St. Paul's Episcopal Church	St. Paul's Episcopal Church	September 22, 1971 (#71000111)	Safford and 3rd Sts. 31°42′54″N 110°04′01″W	Tombstone	
68	San Bernardino Ranch	San Bernardino Ranch	October 15, 1966 (#66000170)	17 miles (27 km) east of Douglas on the international boundary 31°20′12″N 109°16′47″W	Douglas	National Historic Landmark site associated with early cattle ranching in southern Arizona and northern Mexico
69	Harry Saxon House	Harry Saxon House	May 27, 1987 (#87000750)	308 S. Haskell; 32°15′00″N 109°50′04″W	Willcox	
70	Schilling Ranch Historic District		August 7, 2009 (#09000608)	6396 N. Schilling Ranch Rd. 32°19′55″N 110°07′19″W	Corral	
71	Schwertner House	Schwertner House	August 25, 1983 (#83002986)	124 E. Stewart St. 32°15′12″N 109°49′53″W	Willcox	
72	Sierra Bonita Ranch	Sierra Bonita Ranch	October 15, 1966 (#66000181)	Southwest of Bonita; 32°30′36″N 110°02′15″W	Bonita	Extends into Graham County
73	Silver Peak Lookout Complex	Silver Peak Lookout Complex	January 28, 1988 (#87002469)	Coronado National Forest; 31°54′20″N 109°11′56″W	Portal	An L-4 type lookout house measuring 14 feet square. Built in 1938 by a CCC crew. Part of National Forest Fire Lookouts in the Southwestern Region TR. Listed on National Register on January 28, 1988. Burned down in an October, 1992, thunder and snow storm. Only a foundation remains.
74	J.H. Smith Grocery Store and Filling Station	J.H. Smith Grocery Store and Filling Station	July 21, 2004 (#04000720)	1835 Old Ranch Rd. 32°01′39″N 110°02′16″W	Dragoon	
75	Smith-Beck House	Smith-Beck House	March 11, 1994 (#94000077)	425 Huachuca St. 31°57′53″N 110°17′48″W	Benson	
76	Pablo Soto House	Pablo Soto House	August 18, 1987 (#87000744)	108 E. Stewart; 32°15′12″N 109°49′54″W	Willcox	
77	Stafford Cabin	Stafford Cabin	March 31, 1975 (#75000171)	30 miles (48 km) southeast of Willcox in Chiricahua National Monument; 32°00′32″N 109°22′07″W	Willcox	
78	Tombstone City Hall	Tombstone City Hall	February 1, 1972 (#72000195)	315 E. Fremont St. 31°42′48″N 110°04′00″W	Tombstone	
79	Tombstone Courthouse	Tombstone Courthouse	April 13, 1972 (#72000196)	219 E. Toughnut; 31°42′39″N 110°04′10″W	Tombstone	
80	Tombstone Historic District	Tombstone Historic District	October 15, 1966 (#66000171)	U.S. Route 80; 31°42′49″N 110°04′05″W	Tombstone	
81	John Treu House	John Treu House	September 7, 1995 (#95001077)	205 W. Vista, Warren Townsite; 31°24′46″N 109°52′45″W	Bisbee	
82	Max Treu Territorial Meat Company	Max Treu Territorial Meat Company	March 11, 1994 (#94000075)	305 E. 4th St. 31°58′04″N 110°17′39″W	Benson	
83	U.S. Inspection Station--Douglas, Arizona	U.S. Inspection Station--Douglas, Arizona	May 22, 2014 (#14000242)	Pan American Hwy. & 1st St. 31°20′04″N 109°33′36″W	Douglas	Part of the U.S. Border Inspection Stations
84	US Post Office and Customs House-Douglas Main	US Post Office and Customs House-Douglas Main	December 3, 1985 (#85003104)	601 10th St. 31°20′41″N 109°33′10″W	Douglas	
85	Warren Historic District		December 10, 2025 (#100012280)	Generally bounded by Bisbee Road and Cole Avenue to the North, Adsit Street to the east and south, and Central Avenue to the west. 31°24′40″N 109°52′43″W	Bisbee	
86	Willcox Women's Club	Willcox Women's Club	May 27, 1987 (#87000740)	312 W. Stewart; 32°15′17″N 109°50′04″W	Willcox	
87	J.C. Wilson House	J.C. Wilson House	August 18, 1987 (#87000747)	258 E. Maley; 32°15′03″N 109°49′47″W	Willcox	

== See also ==
- List of National Historic Landmarks in Arizona
- National Register of Historic Places listings in Arizona
