= Officers Club =

Officers Club, The Officers Club or similar may refer to:

== Buildings and locations ==
- Officers' Club (Belgrade), a building in Belgrade, Serbia
- Officers Club, Dhaka, a government (and related) officers' club in Bangladesh
- Officers Club Services Ground, a cricket ground in Hampshire, England
- Camp Breckinridge Non-Commissioned Officers' Club, a historic clubhouse in Morganfield, Kentucky
- Fort Totten Officers' Club, a historic clubhouse in Queens, New York
- Military officers' club, a military base building intended for off-duty use by officers
- Mountain View Officers' Club, a historic clubhouse at Fort Huachuca, Arizona
- Police Officers' Club Stadium, a multi-use stadium in Dubai

== Other uses ==
- The Officers Club, a former UK menswear retailer, part of Blue Inc.
