= Ernest Browning =

Arizona cattle rancher (1899–1984)

J. Ernest Browning (1899 – November 19, 1984) was an American cattle rancher.

Browning was born in 1899 in Elk Canyon, New Mexico, and moved to Willcox, Arizona with his family in 1913. During the 1940s and 1950s, he acquired several ranches, the High Lonesome, the Schilling, and the Muleshoe, creating a single huge ranch.

Browning helped to organize the American Quarter Horse Association in 1940.

In 1967, Browning was inducted into the Arizona Horsemen's Hall of Fame, and in 1991, along with Barry Goldwater, he was inducted into the National Cowboy Hall of Fame.

In 1982, he was awarded the National Livestock Association's "Golden Spur Award" for his contributions to the nation's livestock and ranching industries. Also in 1982, he was inducted into the American Quarter Horse Hall of Fame. He was also co-founder of the National Cowboy & Western Heritage Museum.

Browning died on November 19, 1984.
