= Portal Ranger Station =

- U.S. National Register of Historic Places
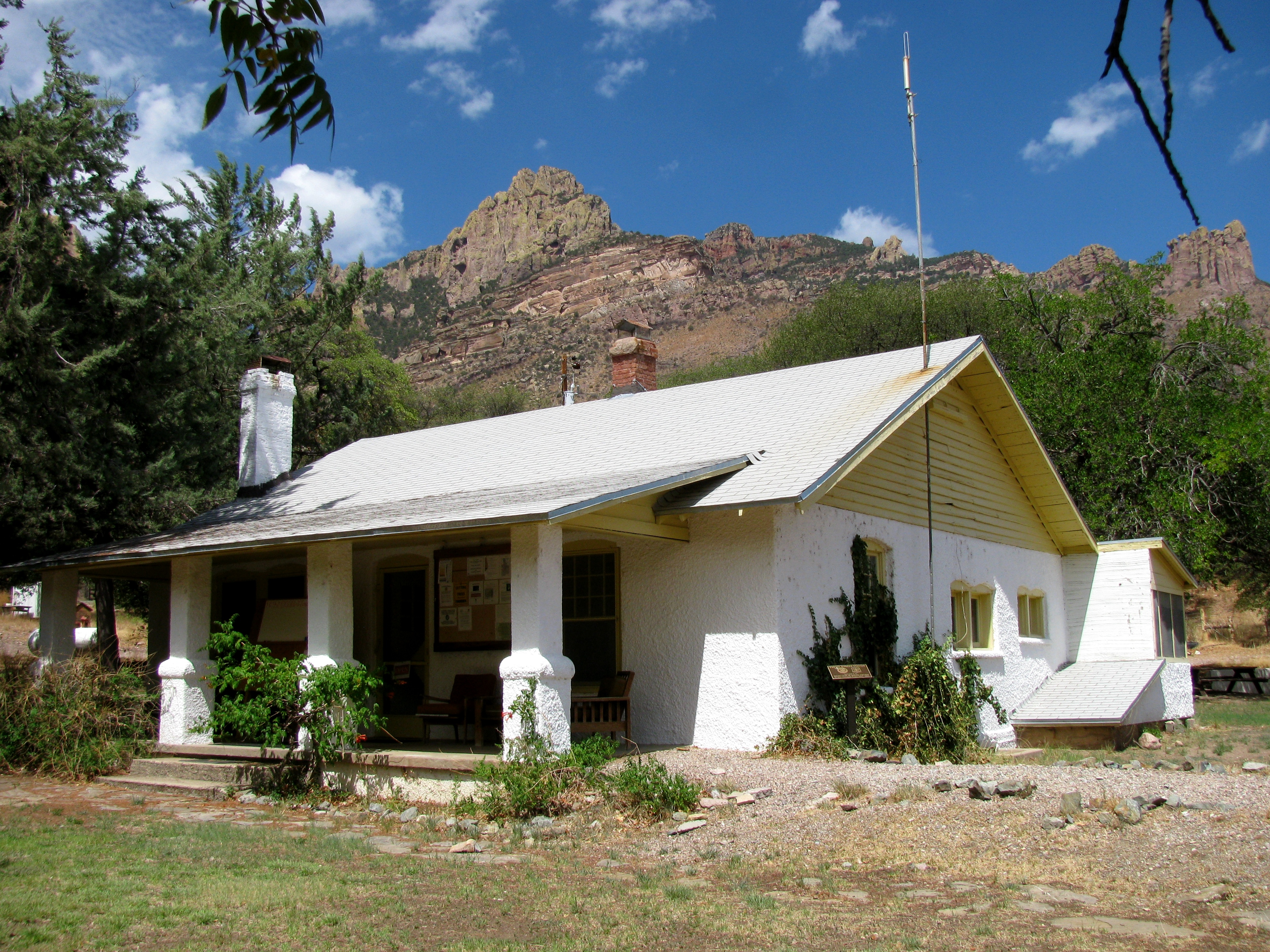
- Portal Ranger Station

- Location within Arizona Location within the United States
- Nearest city: Portal, Arizona
- Coordinates: 31°53′56″N 109°9′41″W
- Area: 1 acre (0.40 ha)
- Built: 1934
- Architect: USDA Forest Service
- Architectural style: Bungalow/Craftsman
- MPS: Depression-Era USDA Forest Service Administrative Complexes in Arizona MPS
- NRHP reference No.: 93000517
- Added to NRHP: June 10, 1993

The Portal Ranger Station, also known as Portal Work Station, is located in Cave Creek Canyon, in the eastern Chiricahua Mountains, in Coronado National Forest near Portal, southeastern Arizona.

The office building and the pumphouse building of the complex were built in 1934 by the Civilian Conservation Corps. The office was designed by architects of the United States Forest Service in a Craftsman Bungalow style.

The station was listed on the National Register of Historic Places in 1993 for its Bungalow/Craftsman architecture. The NRHP listing was for three contributing buildings on a 1-acre (0.40 ha) property.

It was deemed significant "for its association with expansion of Forest Service administration from custodial superintendence to active resource management."

== See also ==
- National Register of Historic Places listings in Cochise County, Arizona
- American Craftsman architecture in Arizona
