= Council Rocks Archaeological District =

- U.S. National Register of Historic Places
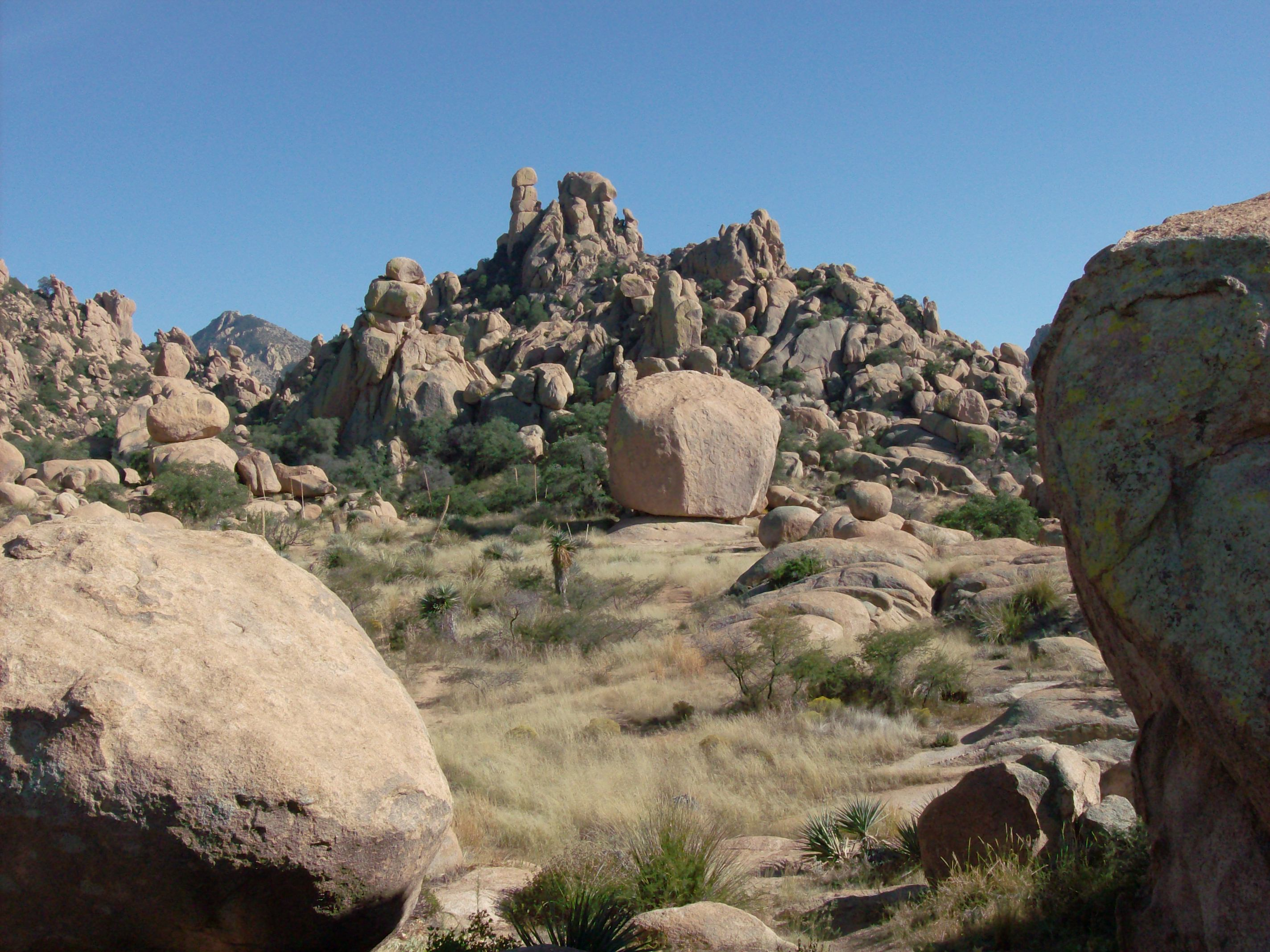
- Location: St. David, Arizona
- NRHP reference No.: 86003666
- Added to NRHP: January 16, 1987

Council Rocks Archaeological District is an historical district in Cochise County, near St. David, Arizona. It is located in the Coronado National Forest, along the western edge of the Dragoon Mountains. It is a canyon flanked by granite cliffs, and full of large boulders. It contains seven archeological sites, all boulder-formed shelters, five of which have pictographs. It was the site of the signing of a peace treaty between Cochise and General O. O. Howard in 1872. During the late 1800s it was a stronghold for Cochise and the Chiricahua Apaches. The site also includes several historic metates.
