= Benjamin E. Briscoe House =

- U.S. National Register of Historic Places
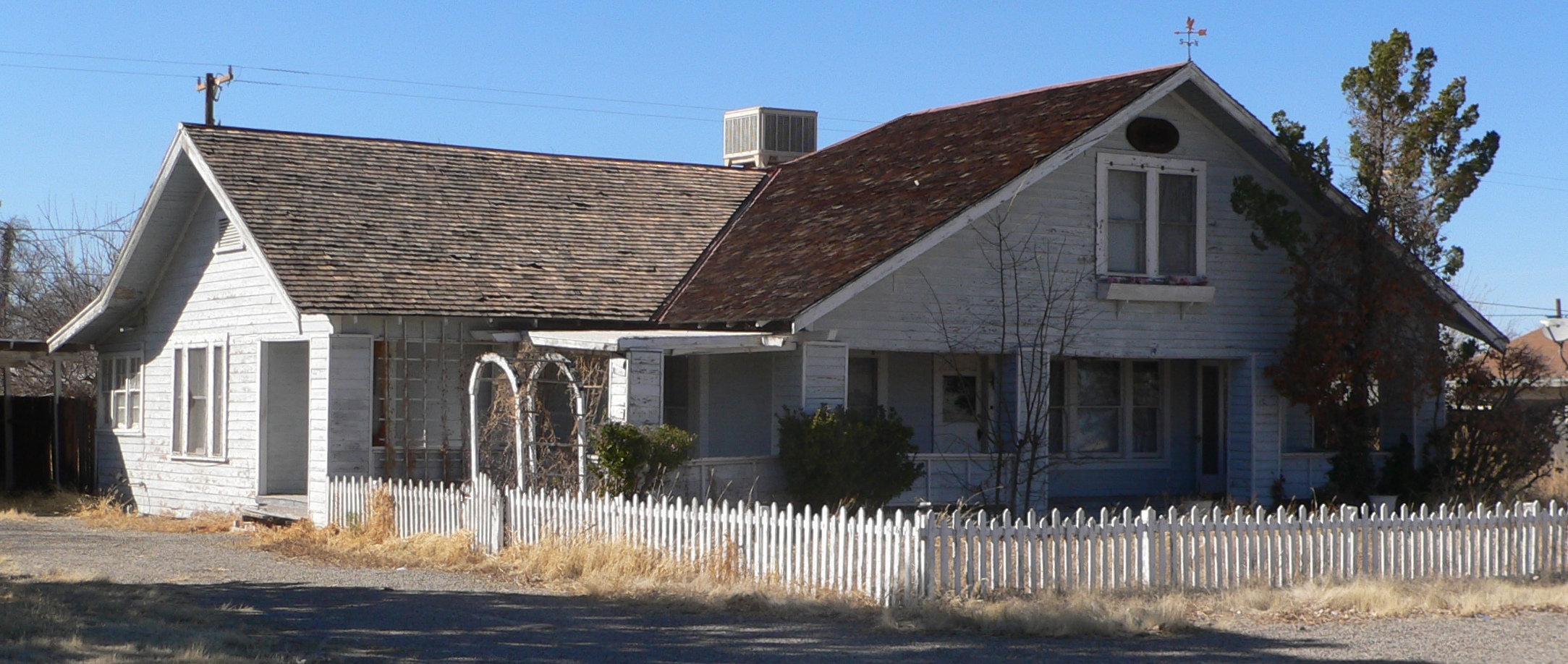
- As seen from the southeast in 2012

- Location within Arizona Location within the United States
- Location: 358 North Bowie Street, Willcox, Arizona
- Coordinates: 32°15′28″N 109°50′21″W
- NRHP reference No.: 87000737
- Added to NRHP: May 27, 1987

The Benjamin E. Briscoe House is a historic house in Willcox, Arizona, located at 358 North Bowie Street. It was listed on the National Register of Historic Places in 1987. It was the home of Benjamin E. Briscoe, who moved to Willcox from his native Tennessee in 1909, and served three years in the Arizona State Legislature.

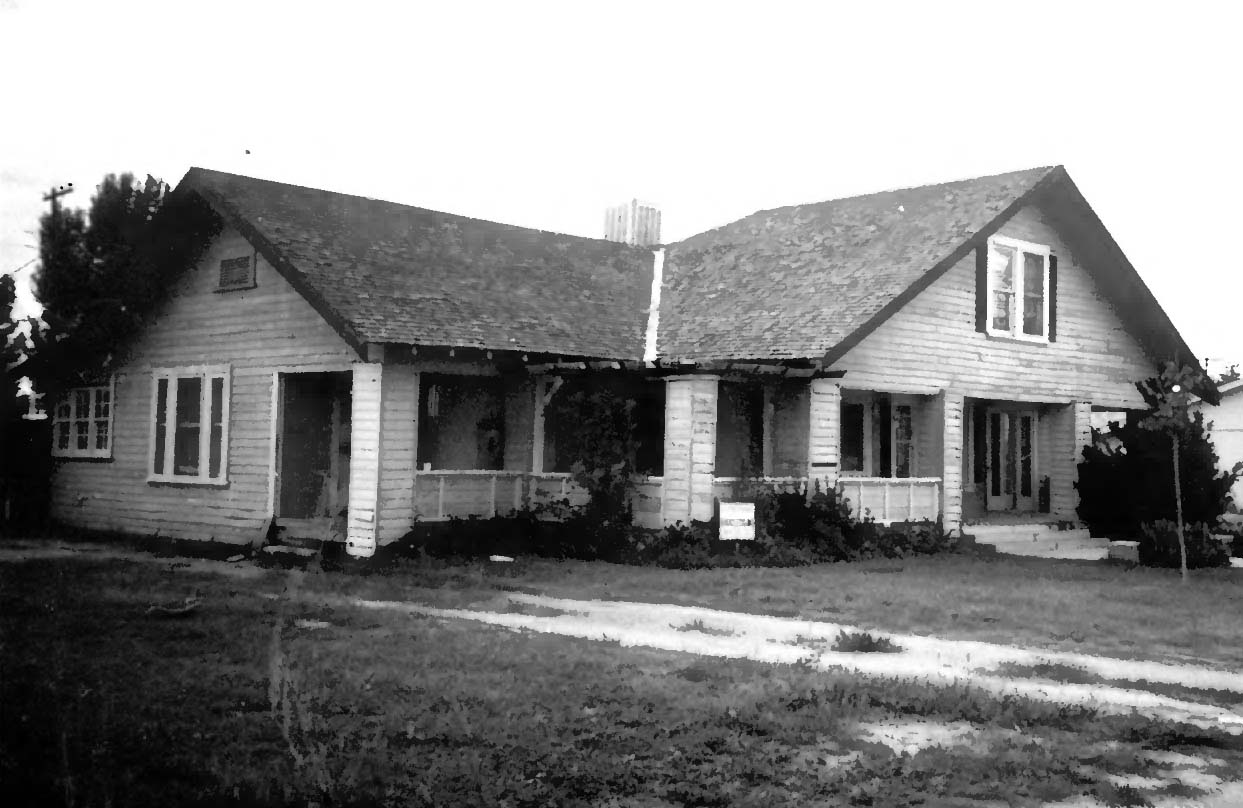
Benjamin E. Briscoe House, 1986

The house is a wood-frame Craftsman Bungalow on a concrete foundation and clapboard siding. It has a high L-shaped gable roof with wooden shingles. It has a central recessed entry, with panel wood door with a single light, wooden screen door. It has a platform recessed verandah on the first floor, sitting on wooden piers. It was constructed in 1898, with an additional wing added in 1920. It is the earliest remaining intact Bungalow in Willcox.
