= Harry Saxon House =

- U.S. National Register of Historic Places
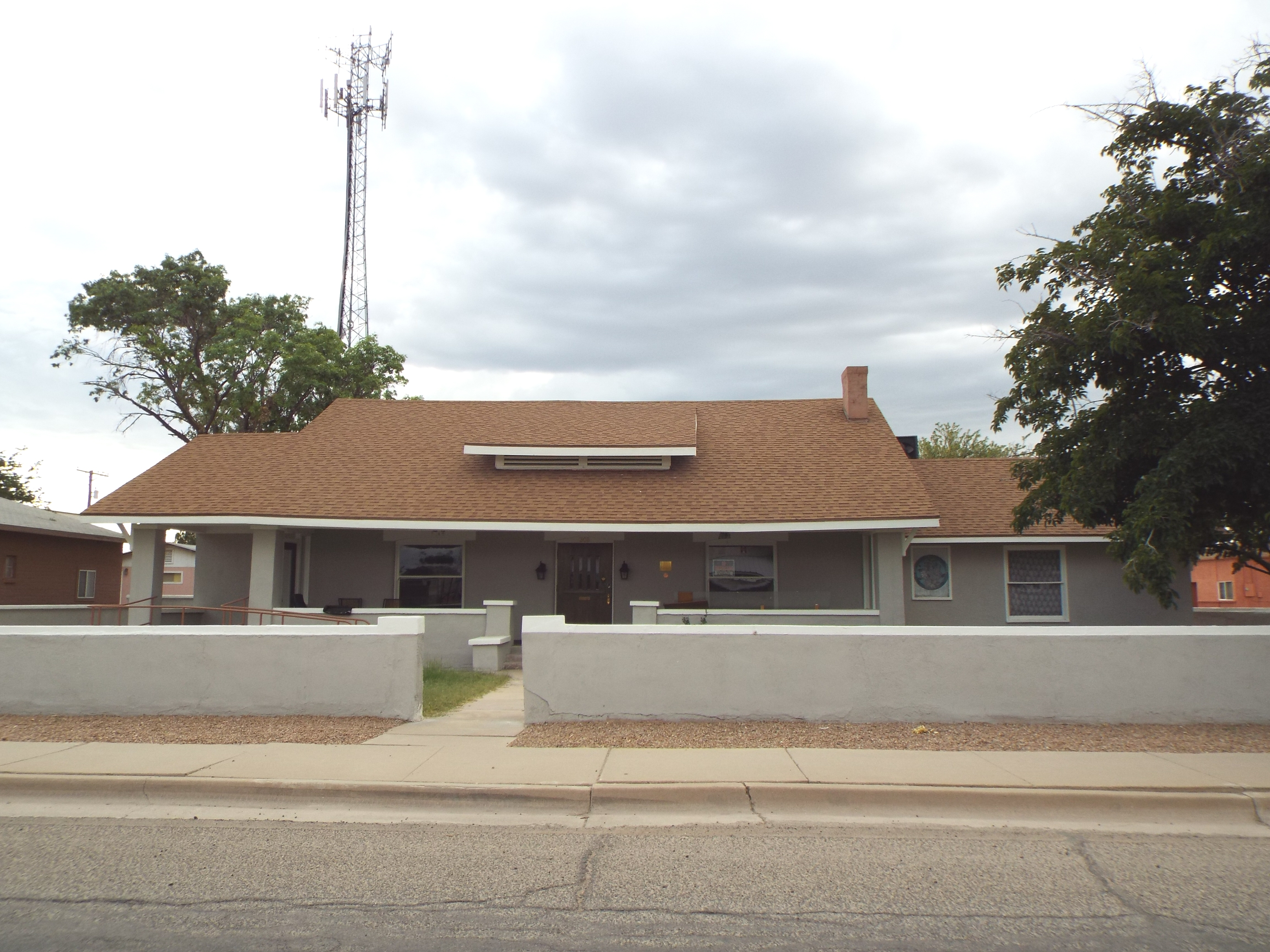
- The house in 2019

- Location within Arizona Location within the United States
- Location: 308 S. Haskell Street, Willcox, Arizona
- Coordinates: 32.25013°N 109.83446°W
- NRHP reference No.: 87000750
- Added to NRHP: May 27, 1987

The Harry Saxon House is an historic structure located in Willcox, Arizona. It was added to the National Register of Historic Places on March 27, 1987.

The house is an adobe Bungalow style home, considered a rare house type, for its combination of building materials and house style. The house was built as the town-home of Harry Saxon, who owned the nearby Box Bar Ranch, and had been a sheriff during Arizona's territorial days, as well as serving in Arizona's First State Legislature.

The house sits on an adobe foundation and has a stucco exterior. It has a gable roof covered in wooden shingles. There is a platform veranda-style porch with wood piers, and a central panel door main entrance, the a single window.
