= Joe Mee House =

- U.S. National Register of Historic Places
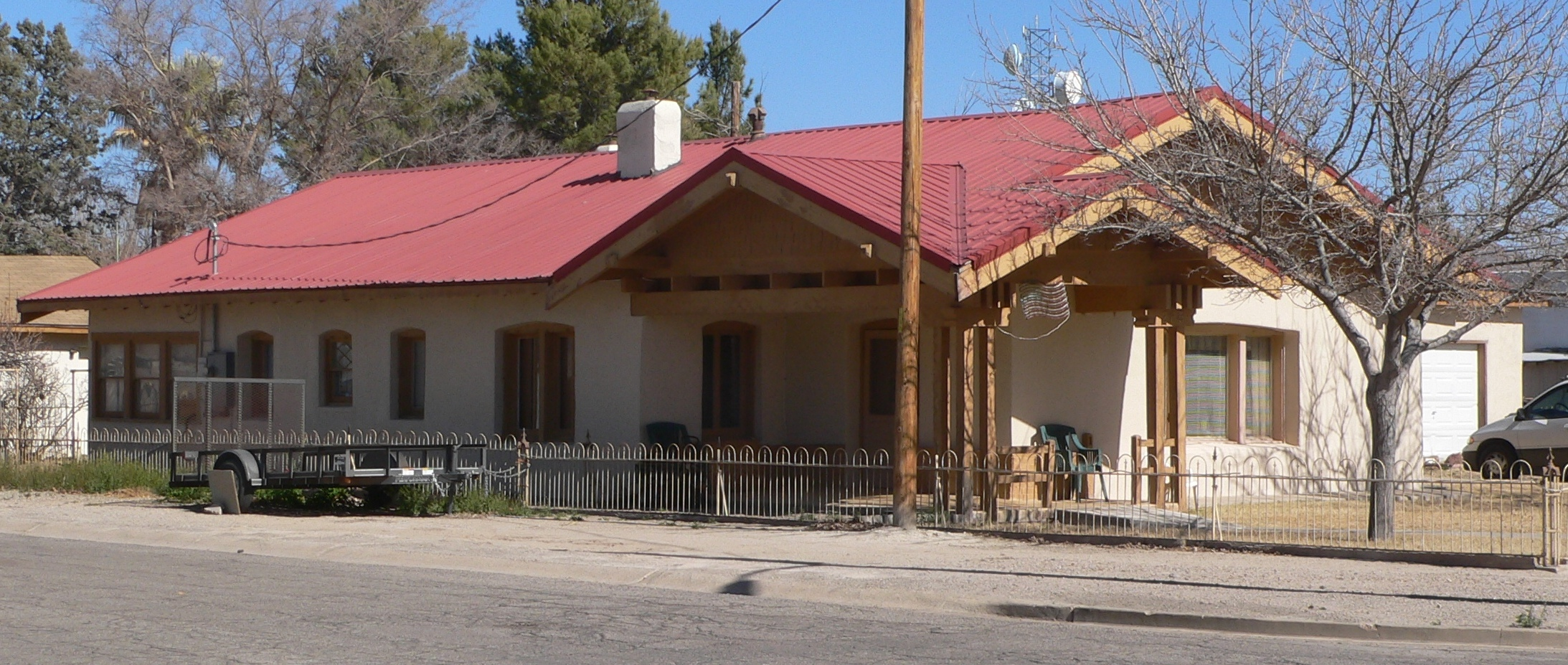

- Location within Arizona Location within the United States
- Location: 265 W. Stewart, Willcox, Arizona
- Coordinates: 32°15′18″N 109°50′02″W
- NRHP reference No.: 87000739
- Added to NRHP: August 6, 1987

The Joe Mee House is an historic residence located in Willcox, Arizona. It was added to the National Register of Historic Places in 1987.

The house is the only known example of an adobe Craftsman bungalow in southern Arizona. The use of adobe was most likely used due to its local availability, and this house is a unique use combining the materials and style. It is most likely that the structure was built by a local cattleman, Joe Mee, who was the son-in-law of the founder of Willcox, Henry A. Morgan. The contractor was W. S. Hunt, and was built around 1920. At one point, the house served as a mortuary.

Sitting on a concrete foundation, the house has a medium gable roof with two chimneys, covered with wooden shingles. It has projecting eaves with exposed rafters and a wood shingle pediment. The main entrance is an off-center wood door with a single light and a wooden screen door; while the porches are open with an open railing and plain posts, covered with a gabled roof and wood-shingle pediment. The original garage has been converted into a guest house, and at some point in the 1930s an addition was added to the rear of the structure.
