= John H. Norton and Company Store =

- U.S. National Register of Historic Places
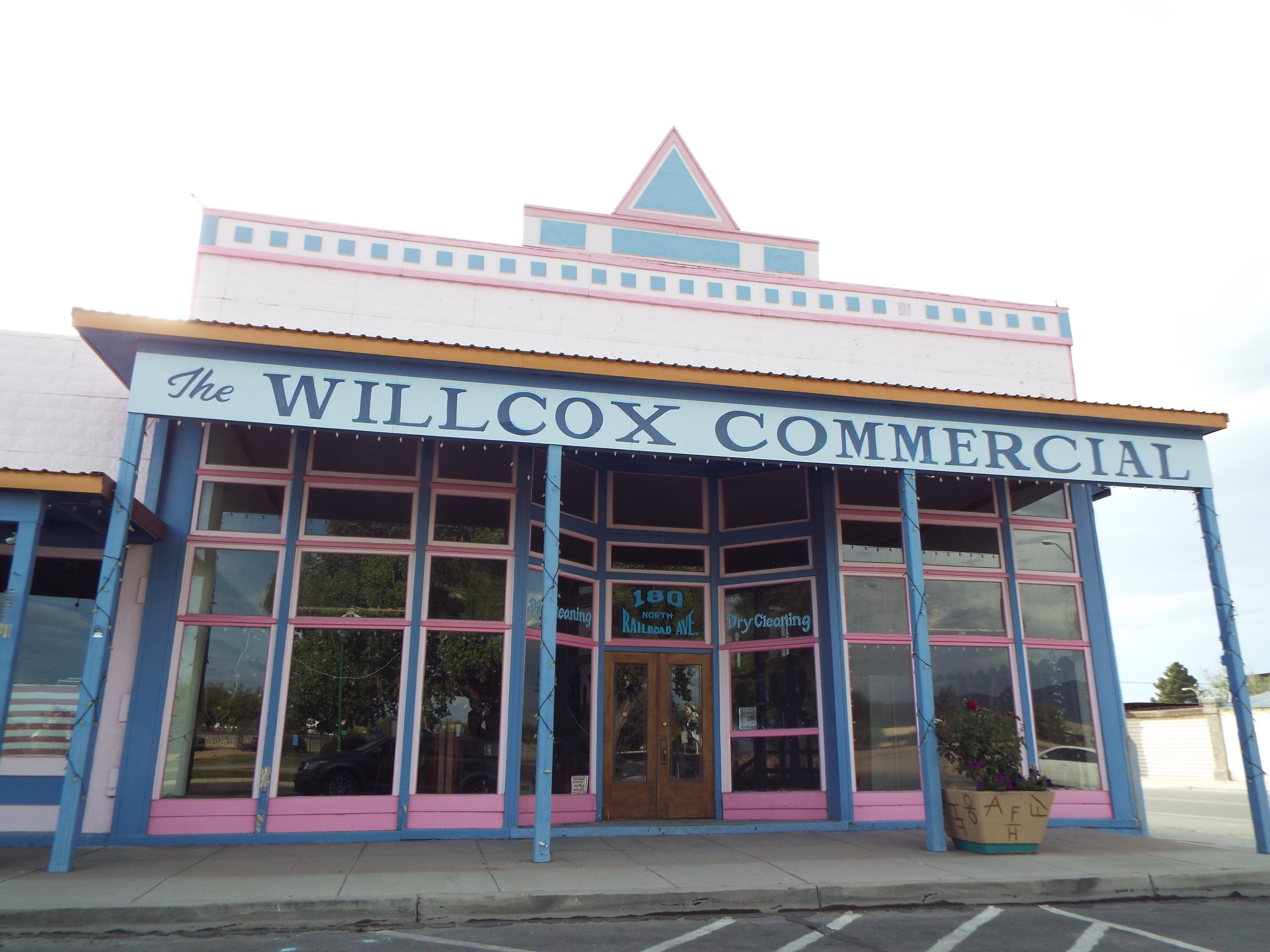
- The building, 2019

- Location within Arizona Location within the United States
- Location: 180 North Railroad Avenue, Willcox, Arizona
- Coordinates: 32°15′11″N 109°49′51″W
- NRHP reference No.: 83002987
- Added to NRHP: March 31, 1983

The John H. Norton and Company Store is an historic structure in Willcox, Arizona, United States. Built circa 1880, it was added to the National Register of Historic Places in 1983.

== Description ==
The Willcox Commercial Company building, built c. 1880, is a large (84' x 100') single story adobe commercial structure with a two-story dwelling (20' x 60') incorporated into the rear. It faces southeast on Railroad Avenue in Willcox. Railroad Avenue is parallel with the Southern Pacific Railroad track alignment and historically was the focus of commercial life in Willcox. That focus has since shifted, but the Willcox Commercial Company is one of the major resources of the locally designated Railroad Avenue Historic District.

The present configuration of the Willcox Commercial Company is the result of an early evolutionary adaptive process. The 20'x100' center section was constructed first, c. 1880. The north 40' x 100' section was then added sometime before 1900, and the south 24' x 80' section was built last, c. 1920. The original ornate pressed metal storefront above the display windows was removed in the early 1920s and replaced with rusticated metal panels. The awning was also lowered at that time. The main section of the facade features a continuous commercial storefront with three bay-wide display windows and transoms flanking a recessed central entry bay. Continuing to the south, two additional storefronts extend the facade to its full width. A stepped parapet wall finished with rusticated pressed metal rises above the display windows, and a flat awning supported by struts and posts projects from this surface. A vestige of the original boomtown facade remains, forming the appearance of the second story. The north elevation has five windows situated below the eave line and a water table extends the full length of the building. Quoins articulate the northeast corner.

The west (rear) elevation features a two-story residential section approximately 20' x 60', surmounted by a gable roof. Openings include paired entry doors and flanking windows below and large paired one-over-one double hung windows above. The remainder of this elevation is one story with typical openings for rear access. The south elevation is hidden by an adjacent commercial building. The gable roof is finished with corrugated tin panels. The ridge is situated over the center of the north section and slopes over the center and south sections of the building, Skylights, now covered over, were originally found near the rear of the center section, north section, and on the two story living area to the rear.

The interior of the Willcox Commercial Company reflects both its evolutionary additive character and its commercial use. The large volume is divided into two bays with the dividing wall exhibiting an early smaller opening and one larger opening made in 1972. The floors are finished throughout with hardwood, and the ceiling in each of the three sections is finished with pressed metal in different patterns. The ceiling of the north bay is insulated with a thick layer of dirt, a method not uncommon to early construction in Arizona.

The rear of the north bay features an office balcony which retains its original spaces, materials, and some furnishings, including a large safe. The balustrade leading to the office features square, boxed newel posts capped with marble. A living area is connected to the office balcony and most of the original floor plan is intact.

== History ==
The area in which Willcox is located was the primary focus of the United States military campaign against the Chiricahua in the second half of the 19th century. As part of this campaign, Fort Bowie was established in 1862, approximately 25 miles southeast of present-day Willcox. This was the only outpost of civilization in the area until Fort Grant was established 35 miles to the north in 1872. Later, Fort Thomas was established 60 miles to the north in 1833.

A second major influence in the development of the region was the construction of the Southern Pacific Railroad. Grading for the alignment was underway in Sulphur Springs Valley in 1877, and a temporary camp was set up at the present site of Will cox by 1878. By 1880 the railroad reached Willcox and the settlement was well on its way to becoming a permanent town in the Arizona Territory. An article in the Arizona Daily Star on October 28, 1880, reported that a building boom was underway with tents being replaced by permanent stone and adobe structures. At that time the town was named in honor of General O. B. Willcox, commander of the Department of Arizona.

A third major factor in the historical development of Willcox was the cattle ranching industry. At that time Sulphur Springs Valley was one of the finest stock ranges in the west. Willcox developed into a supply point for ranchers throughout the region due to the presence of the railroad and quickly grew to importance as a cattle shipping center.

The Willcox Commercial Company originated through the efforts of John H. Norton, and M. W. Stewart, two of the earliest businessmen in the community. Norton was a post trader at Fort Grant in 1876 and recognized the larger regional opportunities of the mercantile business. He joined forces with Stewart, and in 1880 they set up the John H. Norton and Company in Willcox. The first portion of the present building was erected at this time along with a large warehouse. By 1884 they had a large warehouse, corral and feedyard, beside a large store. In addition to providing the local ranchers and cowboys with needed supplies, the store served the military posts at Fort Bowie, Fort Grant, and Fort Thomas throughout their existence. Norton and Stewart also ran a six horse stage coach line to all three installations.

The John H. Norton and Company store continued to serve the area while Will cox enjoyed a steady growth over the next 25 years. Around the turn of the century, Stewart sold his interest to Henry A. Morgan, who had been the bookkeeper for the store at Fort Grant. The Norton-Morgan Commercial Company expanded its Willcox facilities by building an addition to the north on the corner of Railroad Avenue and Stewart Street. Both wholesale and retail business was carried, and c. 1920 a new addition was built on the south.

A post World War I recession resulted in the sale of the business in 1923 to Guy and Hazel Holt, who changed the name to the Willcox Commercial Company. The Holts owned and operated the business until 1937 when it was sold to Holt's sister and brother-in-law, Edith and Lynn Camp. The Camps operated the business until 1974 when it was sold to Richard and Leona Seidel.

As a major supplier of commercial goods from its inception in 1880 to the present, the Willcox Commercial Company has consistently played a large role in the economic life of Willcox and southeastern Arizona. The significance of the Willcox Commercial Company building is also derived from its association with locally prominent individuals, John H. Norton and Henry A. Morgan. Norton was born near Boston in 1847 and emigrated west to Colorado where, by 1869, he owned a general merchandise store. In 1876 he operated the commissary at Fort Grant and quickly became one of the region's major entrepreneurs. He eventually owned half a dozen stores in northern Cochise County. In addition to those at Fort Grant and Willcox, he owned mercantile establishments in Pearce, Cochise, and Johnson. Henry A. Morgan was associated with the Norton-Morgan Commercial Company during the first two decades of the 20th century. He was a local community leader for 40 years and had the distinction of serving as the first mayor of Willcox.
