= Hooker Town House =

- U.S. National Register of Historic Places
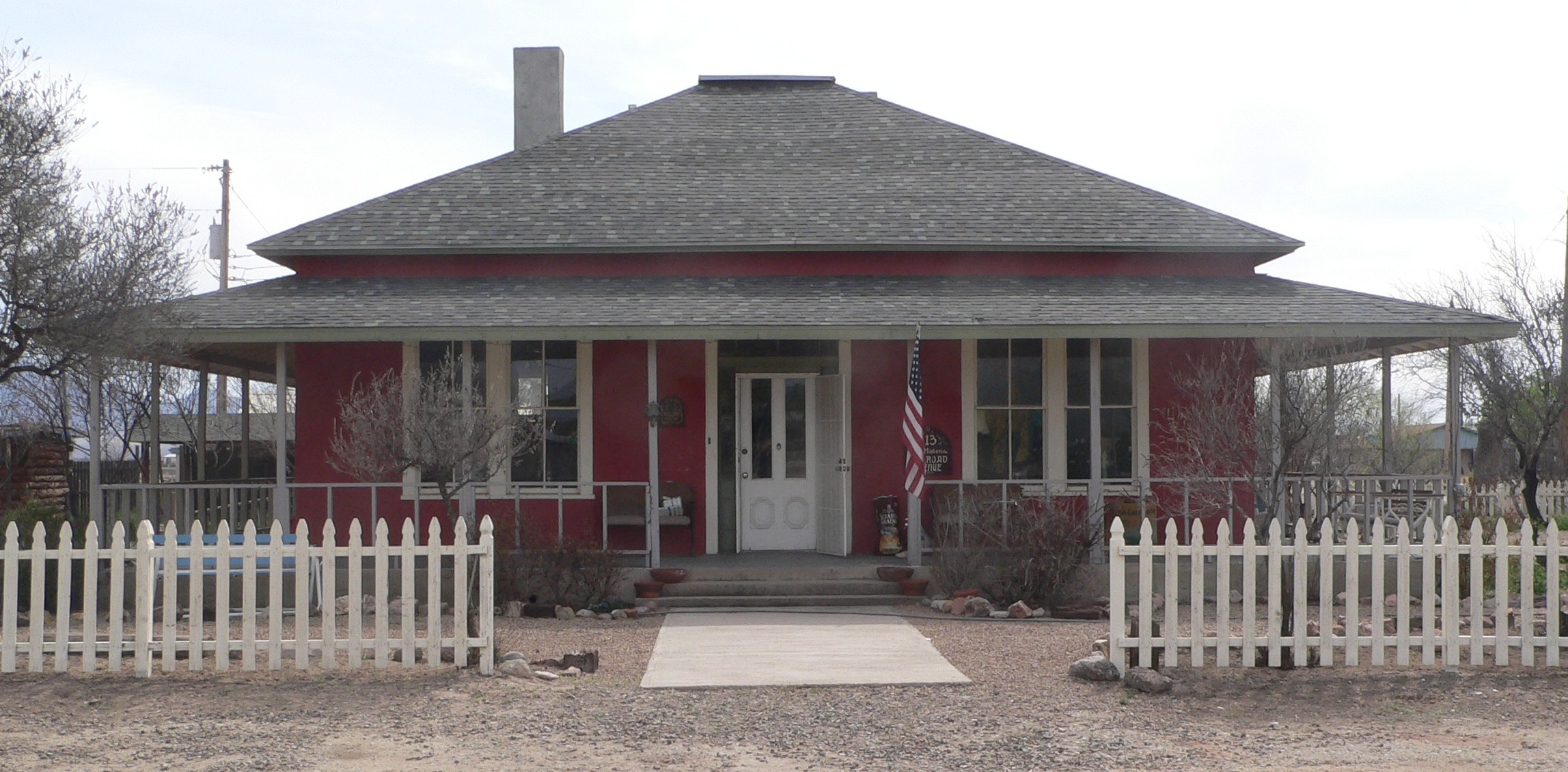
- As seen from northwest

- Location within Arizona Location within the United States
- Location: 235 East Stewart, Willcox, Arizona
- Coordinates: 32°15′10″N 109°49′45″W
- NRHP reference No.: 87000736
- Added to NRHP: May 27, 1987

The Hooker Town House is an example of early adobe Queen Anne style residence. Located in Willcox, Arizona, it was listed on the National Register of Historic Places in 1987.

The house was a home of Henry Hooker, a local rancher, who established the Sierra Bonita Ranch in nearby Sulphur Springs Valley in 1873. The ranch was approximately 30 by 27 miles. It was common at the time for large ranch owners to also own a home in the local town, and this was Hooker's, built circa 1900. A Queen Anne style house of adobe construction. It is a single-story, with a medium hipped roof covered in asphalt shingles, and protruding eaves with plain fascia. The front of the house has a central single door entry with a single light. There is a wrap-around porch, with an open-rail with wooden posts, covered by a shed roof.

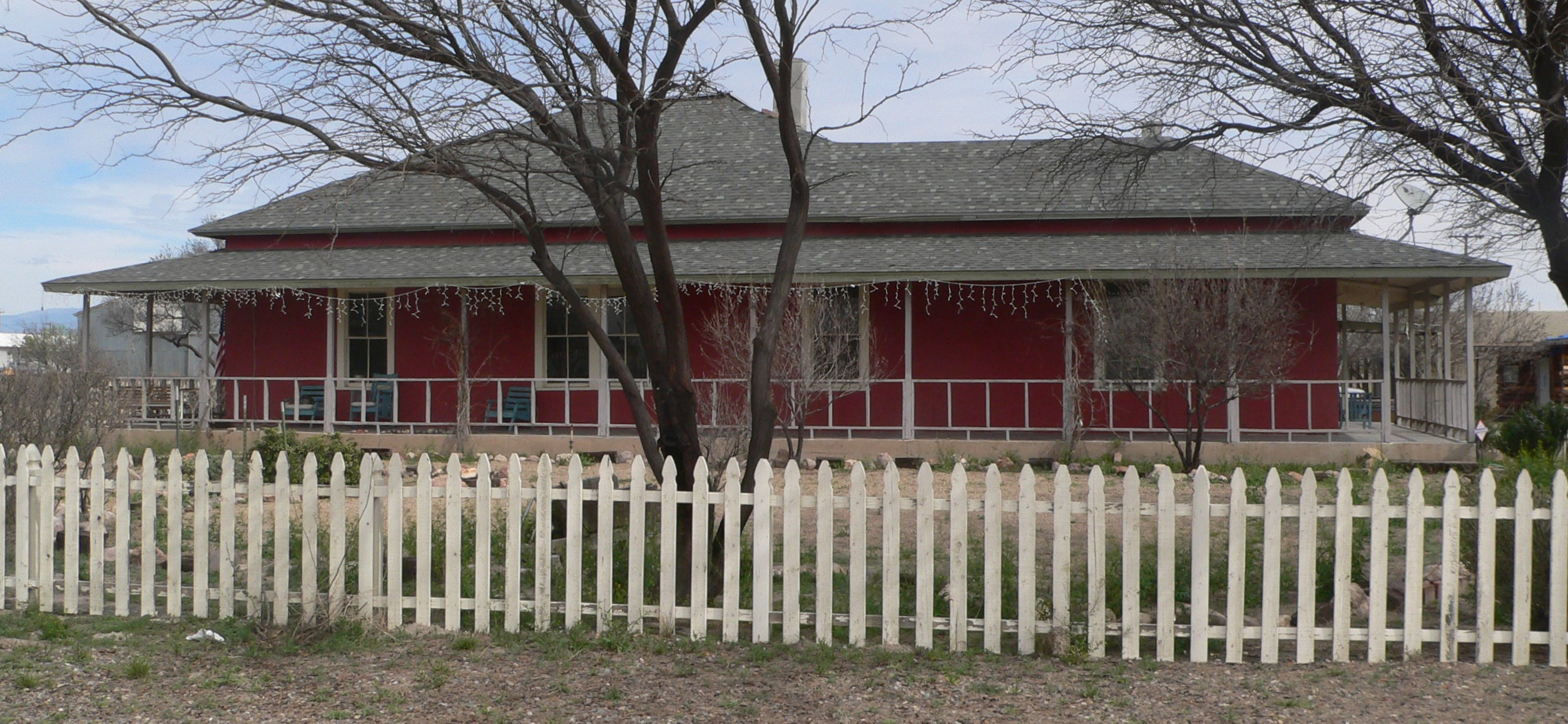
The house as seen from the southwest
