= Bowie School District No. 14 =

- U.S. National Register of Historic Places
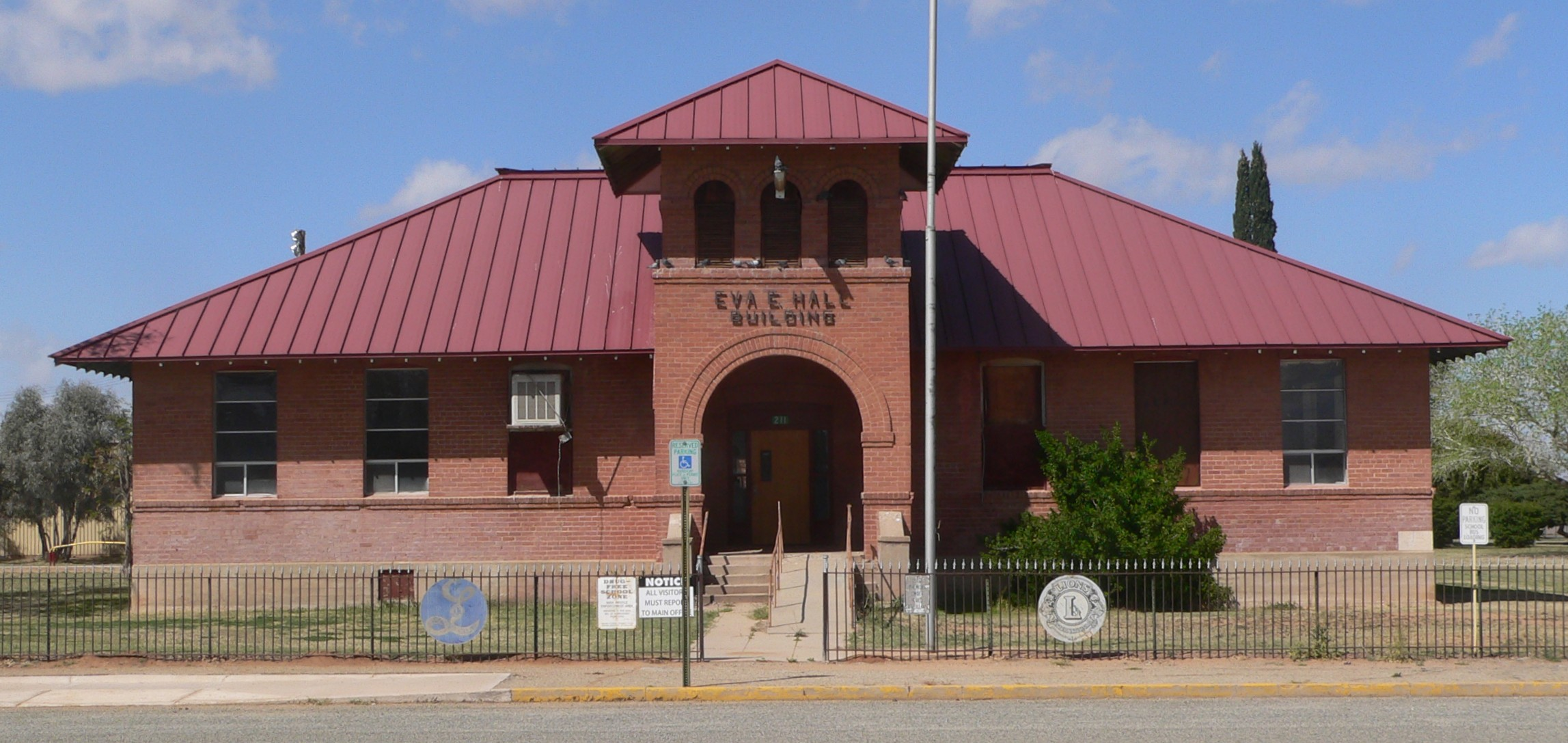
- Bowie Grammar School / Eva E. Hall Building

- Location within Arizona
- Location: 315 W. 5th St., Bowie, Arizona
- Coordinates: 32.3253°N 109.4898°W
- Area: 5.5 acres (2.2 ha)
- NRHP reference No.: 15000168
- Added to NRHP: April 28, 2015

The Bowie School District No. 14 is a complex of four school buildings and supporting structures together on one block in Bowie, Arizona. The entire complex was listed on the National Register of Historic Places as a historic district in 2015.

The schools – Bowie High School (1922), Bowie Grammar School / Eva E. Hall Building (1912–14), Mary Doyle Elementary School (1961), Bruce E. Brown Gymnasium (1940) – were all deemed historic and designated as contributing buildings. Contributing structures were a Works Progress Administration-built swimming pool dating from 1936, a tennis court and an iron fence which partially surrounded the complex.

The listing included the entire block holding all of Bowie's schools and supporting structures. Besides the four contributing buildings and three contributing structures were non-contributing elements: four other buildings, four other structures, and two objects.

The listing of Bowie schools was supported by Bowie alumni and other community members; a 2013 newsletter reported that a graduate student named Kristine Smedley was working on the nomination.

Prolific Tucson-based architect Annie Rockfellow (1866–1954) and Norway-born architect Henry O. Jaastad (1872–1965), who also served as Tucson's mayor, are credited for the architecture.
