= Muheim House =

- U.S. National Register of Historic Places
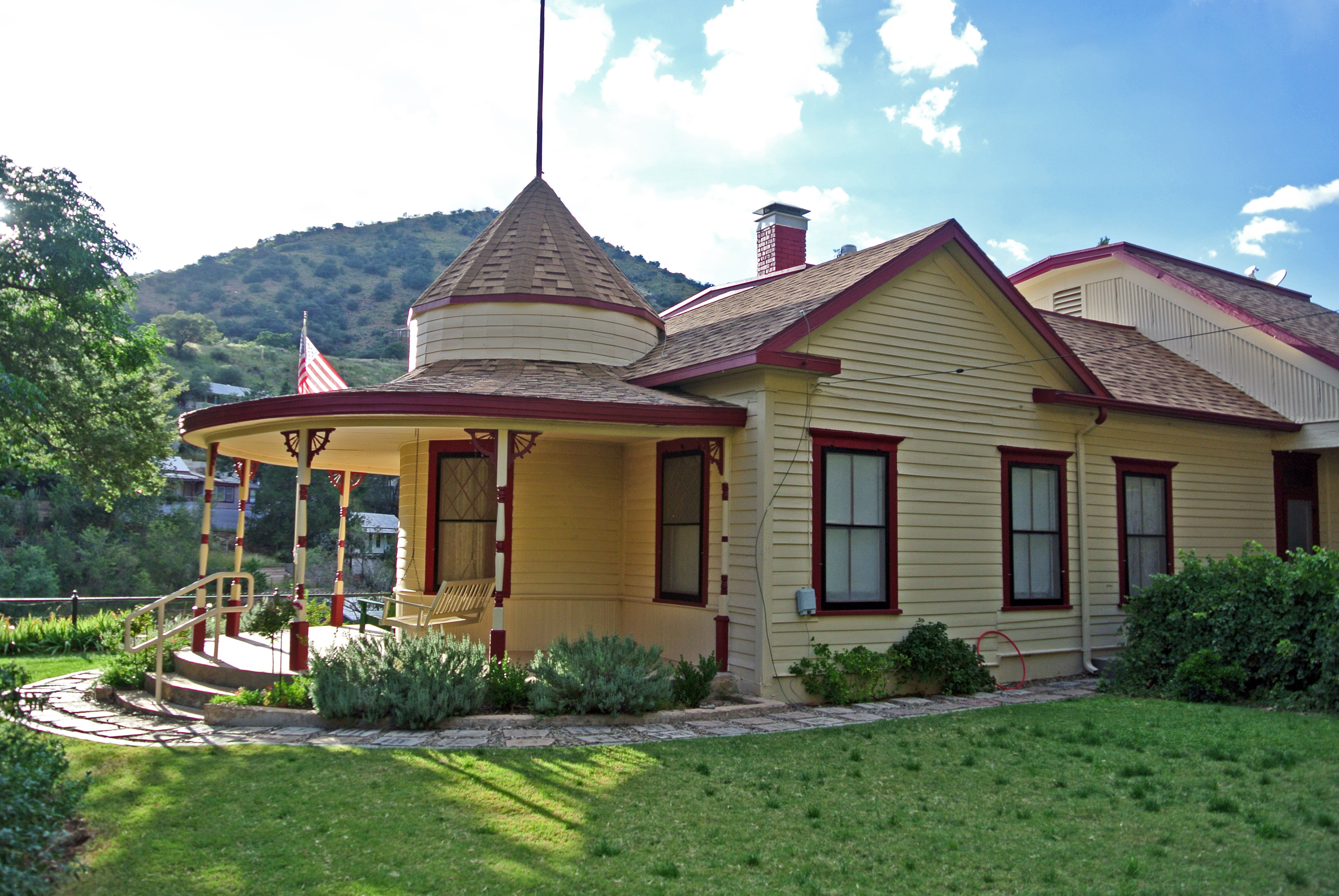
- The house in 2016

- Location within Arizona Location within the United States
- Location: 207 Youngblood Avenue, Bisbee, Arizona
- Coordinates: 31°26′47″N 109°54′45″W
- NRHP reference No.: 79000414
- Added to NRHP: January 13, 1979

The Muheim House is a house located in Bisbee, Arizona, which is on the list of National Register of Historic Places. Built between 1898 and 1900, it had several additions up until 1905. It was named after Joseph Muheim, a local merchant, who helped develop the city of Bisbee.

== Description ==
The Muheim House stands on an irregular lot at the head of Youngblood Avenue on a hill overlooking the old business district of Bisbee, within commanding view of the old business section of Bisbee along Brewery Gulch. The irregular plan, one-story frame house has a cross-gable roof and a cone-roofed, circular tower. The tower, which contains a 9-foot diameter parlor, is skirted by an 8 foot wide semi-circular porch. Vertical wainscoting on the front of the building accents the porch area. The porch roof is supported by turned posts with ornamental brackets. The original wooden porch has been replaced with concrete. The foundation is also concrete. Roof deterioration caused water damage. In the early 1960s, the top of the tower was removed in an attempt to stop leakage. This was rebuilt under an EDA project in 1977. Several original features remain, including wallpaper, rippled window glass, transoms, and iron fence posts. The house itself has a projecting front porch to take advantage of that view and it was constructed in stages.

Construction on the residence began in 1898, but Henry Showers, a long-time Muheim employee who built it, was extremely slow. In 1900, the house was almost completed, but it was already too small because of the birth of the Muheim's first child. The first addition to the house was begun before the roof of the original section was finished. Additions continued to be made as three more children arrived and by 1905 the house had reached its present proportions. The Muheim House was occupied by the family until 1973. Mrs. Muheim died in 1947 and her husband in 1951. Their son Henry lived there until his death in 1973. In 1975, the remaining children gave the house to the city on the condition that the Bisbee Council on the Arts & Humanities should restore and maintain it as a living museum.

== Joseph Muheim ==
Joseph Maria Muheim (1867-1951) came from his native Switzerland to San Francisco in 1883. Two of his uncles, Frank and Henry Dubacher, were miners who had been in the U.S. for several years, arriving in Bisbee sometime before 1882. By 1886 they were engaged in the commercial life of Brewery Gulch. Young Joe's first job, after he arrived in 1888, was to work as a bartender for his uncles. Muheim soon branched out into other activities. He grubstaked prospectors and contracted to supply wood and silica to the smelter. In a few years, he purchased his uncles' saloon. He continued to prosper, and was one of the founders of the Miners & Merchants Bank. In partnership with his uncles and Baptiste Caretto, another prominent businessman, he built several buildings on Brewery Avenue and OK Street, including the Pythian Castle, the Philadelphia Hotel, and the Bisbee Ore newspaper building.

In 1898, Muheim married Carmelita La Forge, a French-Canadian born in Michigan and raised In Quebec. They met while she was working in her aunt's boarding house in nearby Lowell. Muheim's business interests continued to prosper and in 1905 he constructed the imposing Muheim Block (The Brewery) and the Orpheum Theatre at the foot of Brewery Avenue. The Muheim Block is an imposing building that still dominates the entrance to Brewery Gulch. It contained two stores, a restaurant, a saloon, and several offices. Muheim also had extensive mining interests, particularly in northern Mexico.
