= Douglas Residential Historic District =

- U.S. National Register of Historic Places
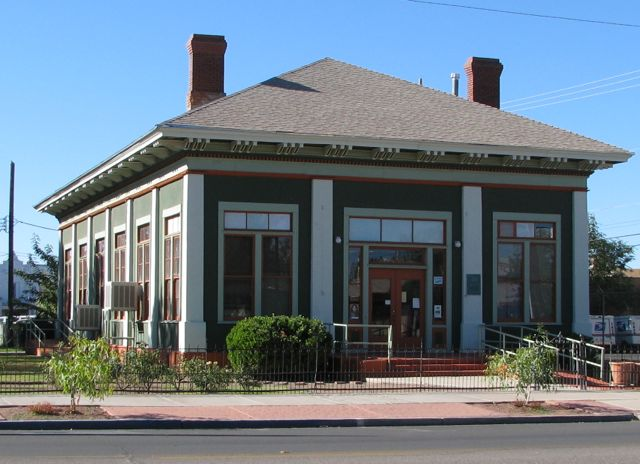
- 605 East 10th Street

- Location within Arizona Location within the United States
- Location: Douglas, Arizona
- Coordinates: 31°20′40″N 109°32′49″W
- NRHP reference No.: 86002095
- Added to NRHP: July 31, 1986

The Douglas Residential Historic District is an area located in Douglas, Arizona, consisting of almost 500 buildings, of which 325 are contributing structures to the District. Architectural styles include Late 19th and 20th Century Revival; Bungalow, Craftsman, Victorian, and Queen Anne.
