= W. D. Martinez General Merchandise Store =

- U.S. National Register of Historic Places
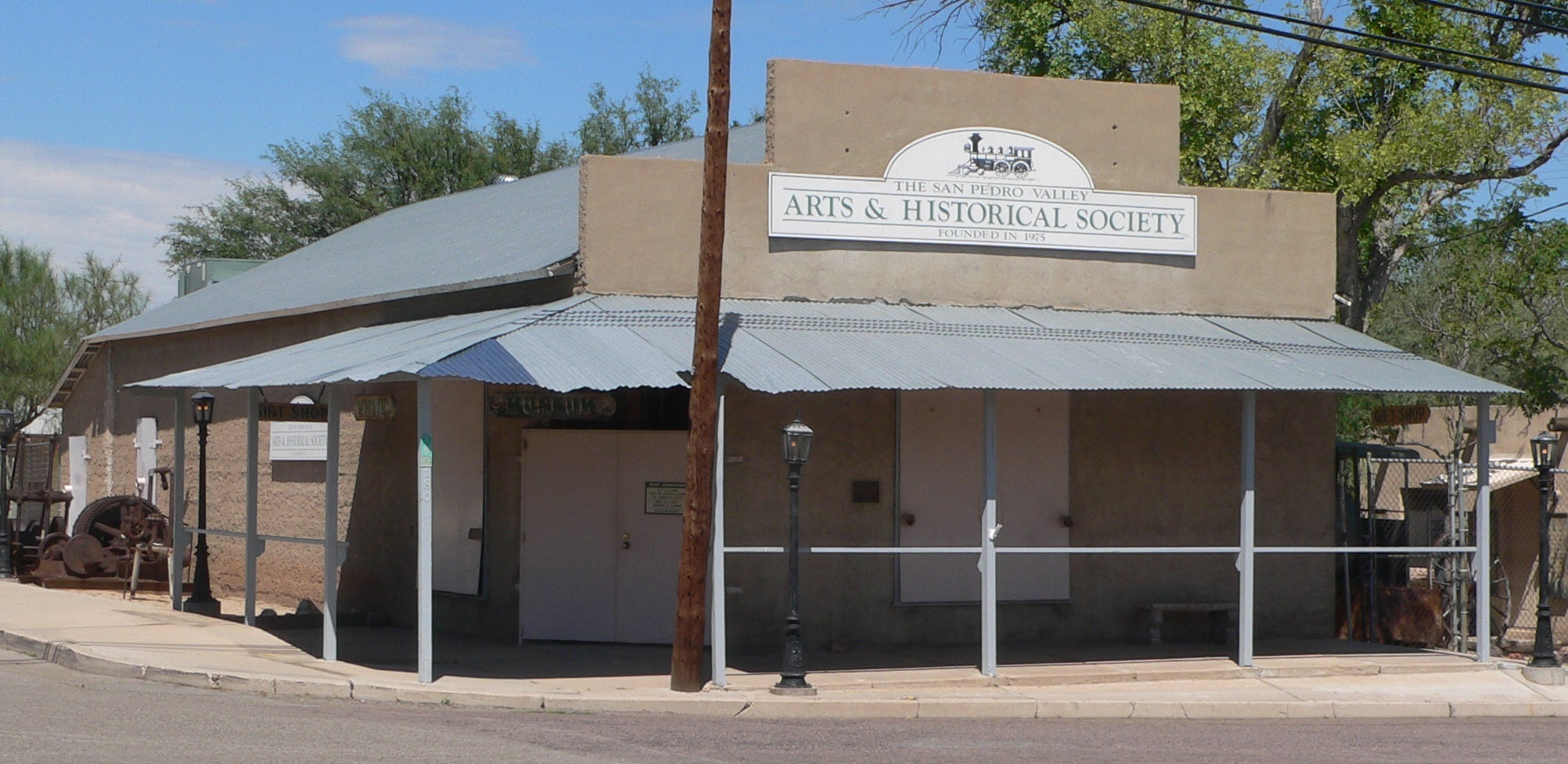
- Ca. 2013

- Location within Arizona Location within the United States
- Location: 180 San Pedro Street, Benson, Arizona
- Coordinates: 31°58′01″N 110°17′42″W
- NRHP reference No.: 94000073
- Added to NRHP: March 11, 1994

The W. D. Martinez General Merchandise Store is an historic building located in Benson, Arizona. It was added to the National Register of Historic Places on March 11, 1994. It was built in 1921 by William D. Martinez, an immigrant from Sonora, Mexico who created the store to serve the Hispanic community which was situated just to its east.

== History ==
William D. Martinez was born in Magdalena, Sonora, before moving to Arizona. He built the structure in 1921 in an isolated spot near a Hispanic neighborhood to its east. While the structural system of the building was atypical, its stepped-parapeted facade was typical of storefronts of the 1920s. He leased the store to S. B. Moss in June 1921, and then sold the building in January 1922 to a mercantile company of Tucson, Albert Steinfeld & Co., owned by Albert Steinfeld, a successful merchant immigrant from Germany. Some time later, the property was purchased by A. E. Ivey Jr., who sold it in March 1983 to its present owner, the San Pedro Historical Society. The building remained a store until its 1983 purchase, after which it was turned into the W. D. Martinez General Merchandise Store/Benson Museum. Today it is home to the San Pedro Valley Arts and Historical Society Museum.

== Description ==
It is situated at the northwest corner of San Pedro and East 5th Streets in Benson, covering four lots (13-16) of block 18. The building is on the southern portion of the lots, with an adjacent yard occupying the north portions. It is a one-story rectangular structure, covering approximately 1688 square feet, with a 100 square foot addition in the building's rear. It sits on a concrete slab foundation, with 8" walls of poured reinforced concrete, sheathed in stucco. It has a wood-trussed roof, covered with corrugated metal.

The original building's San Pedro Street facade, the gabled end, had a stepped parapet, a chamfered corner entry at the southeast corner with 10' high double, carved wooden doors, large fixed-pane, four-light storefront windows on either side of the entry and two-over-two double hung windows. A corrugated metal roofed, wrap-around porch on 4 x 4 posts served both major facades. The rear addition, which functioned as an office, was also of poured concrete and had a corrugated metal shed roof. The interior had jointed concrete flooring, a built-in display platform by the east storefront window and corrugated metal ceilings with redwood crown molding. Since its construction, the wrap-around porch has been replaced by a replica and a double French door was installed in the rear. In addition, new display lighting has been installed, the electricity upgraded, gas furnaces installed, and protective steel shutters installed over the exterior windows.
