= Fry Pioneer Cemetery =

- U.S. National Register of Historic Places
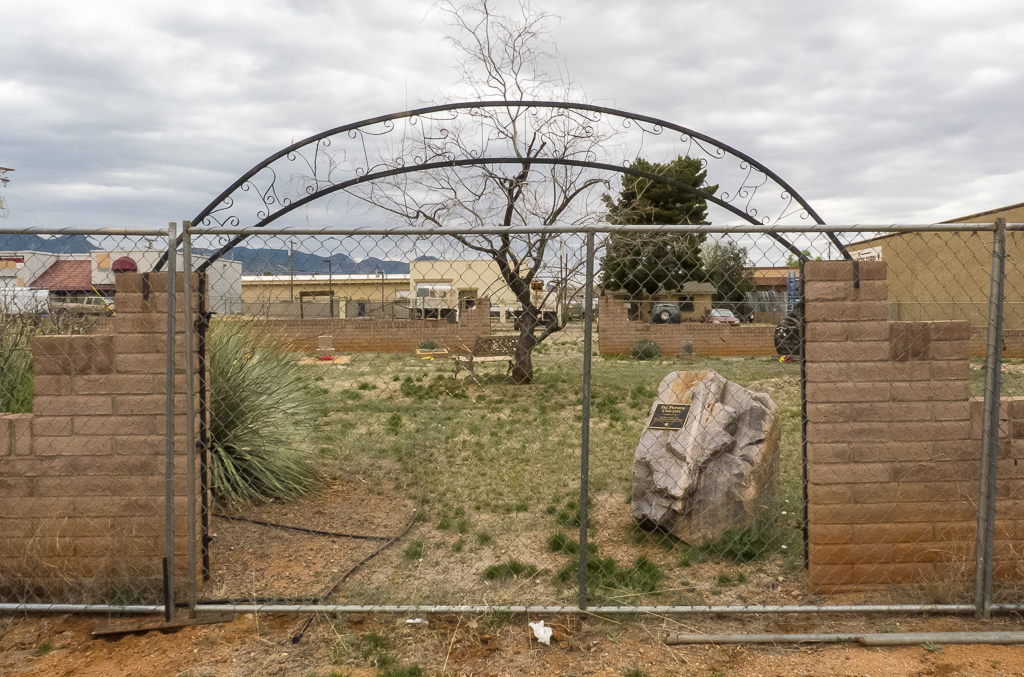
- Entry to the Fry family plot within the cemetery

- Location within Arizona Location within the United States
- Location: Sierra Vista, Arizona
- Coordinates: 31°33′22″N 110°17′30″W
- NRHP reference No.: 08001312
- Added to NRHP: January 15, 2009

Fry Pioneer Cemetery is the original cemetery in Fry, Arizona, which was the name of Sierra Vista prior to its renaming and incorporation in 1956. It is a half-acre site, and includes more than 200 known graves, most of which are unmarked. It has sparse vegetation and is surrounded by a chain-link fence.

The cemetery is a mile east of Fort Huachuca, an active military installation, completely enclosed by urban development. It is located between Sixth and Seventh Streets in Fry, Arizona, which is an unincorporated community wholly within the bounds of the city of Sierra Vista. It is accessible from both Fry Boulevard and the State Highway 90 bypass. There is sparse vegetation, and no planned walkways or landscaping, having developed organically over the years.

The entire cemetery is surrounded by a chain link fence, installed in the 1960s. There is an entrance on the west side. Inside the cemetery is a three-foot brick wall which encloses the family plot of Oliver Fry and his family. The family plot has thirteen graves, all of which have headstones, although one is broken and without an inscription. Outside the family plot, the vast majority of the graves are unmarked. Outside the historic cemetery there are other unmarked graves on the south and east side, some of which have been identified as the resting place of Yaqui Indians. Also outside the historic cemetery, on the east side of Seventh Street, under a commercial parking lot, lie more burial sites.

The cemetery was established in 1919 when Oliver Fry buried his wife, Elizabeth. The cemetery was in general use between 1919 and 1958, but now is only open to burials of descendants of the Fry family. The latest interment was a great-granddaughter of Oliver and Elizabeth in 2005.
