= Oasis Court =

- U.S. National Register of Historic Places
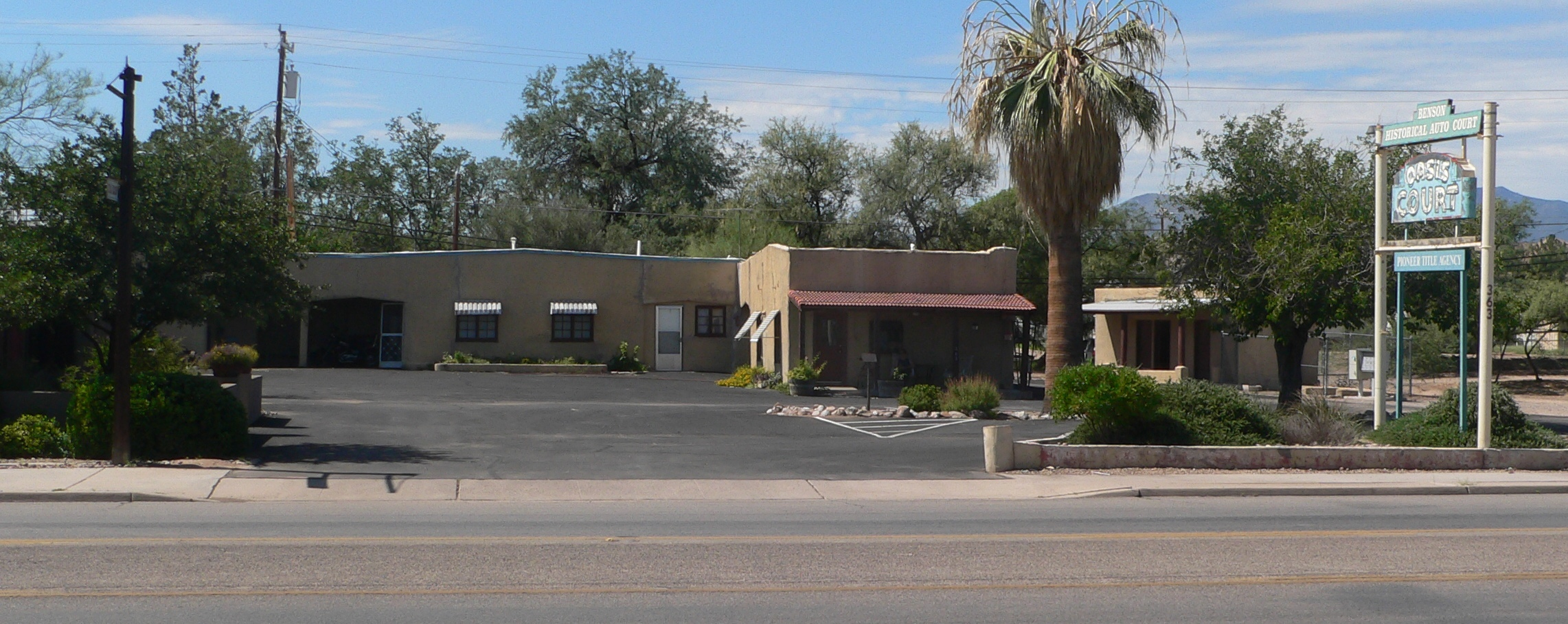
- The building in 2013

- Location within Arizona Location within the United States
- Location: 363 W. 4th Street, Benson, Arizona
- Coordinates: 31°58′09″N 110°18′08″W
- NRHP reference No.: 94000072
- Added to NRHP: March 11, 1994

Oasis Court is a historic auto court located in Benson, Arizona. It was added to the National Register of Historic Places in 1994.

== Description and history ==
The Oasis Court is an example of an auto court, a popular property type during the 1920s and 1930s, when Benson was becoming a major junction point in the national and state highway system. As typical in the evolution of auto courts, it probably began as an auto campground in the 1920s, adding sleeping units and other buildings in the 1930s. A typical auto court, the Oasis Court featured buildings set back from the access road and spread out over several lots to accommodate automobiles. It is located on the south side of 4th Street, occupying six lots. The building configuration is a modified U, with buildings surrounding a large open space used for parking. Large signs, including one of neon, identify the property from the street. The walls are stuccoed wood frame on concrete footings. Floors are slab on grade. Roofs are flat and of rolled composition on two of the buildings. The main structure, with the sleeping rooms, has a foam covered, corrugated metal roof.

The original builders of the Oasis Court were Charles and Minnie Gardner. A former owner was Lyndon L Margrave, an archaeologist and ornithologist, who purchased half interest in the block where the Oasis Court is located in 1940. In the mid-1940s, Mr. Margrave and his wife purchased the entire block and made improvements to the property. They commissioned noted Western artist, Vern Parker, to paint the signs. Huge kachinas and totem poles adorned the property. The buildings were at that time painted a deep Venetian red. The shop featured Native American and Mexican crafts. The name "Oasis Court," the vivid color of the buildings, the Pueblo Revival Style influences in the style, totem poles and the theme shop were tourist-attracting characteristics typical of this property type throughout the southwest.

== Appearance ==
The U-shaped auto court featured three separate one-story buildings built on the tradition of the Pueblo Revival Style. The buildings had parapeted walls with irregular, rounded edges and stucco wall surfaces. To the south, a basically U-shaped building with sculptured parapet walls on three sides housed the individual sleeping units, with covered carports integrated into the building. There was no parapet wall to the rear, to allow the sloped roof to drain. Doors to the individual sleeping rooms were readily accessible to the automobile parking area. Windows were nine light wood Casement window in front and one-over-one light double hung in the rear. The parapet walled building to the northeast of the site, near 4th Street, included a gift shop and residential quarters for the owners. To the west, a small parapet walled utility building was located.

Over the years much of the property has been restored and renovated. The original residential quarters/gift shop now houses a title company, while the sleeping room building is no longer used for overnight accommodations but has been converted to apartments, an office, and a gift shop. The buildings have been restuccoed, reroofed, and repainted. The color is now beige with dark brown trim. The driveway/parking area has been graveled, some of the original wooden casement windows have been replaced by metal casements, and some awnings have been added.
