= Our Lady of Victory Catholic Church (Pearce, Arizona) =

- U.S. National Register of Historic Places
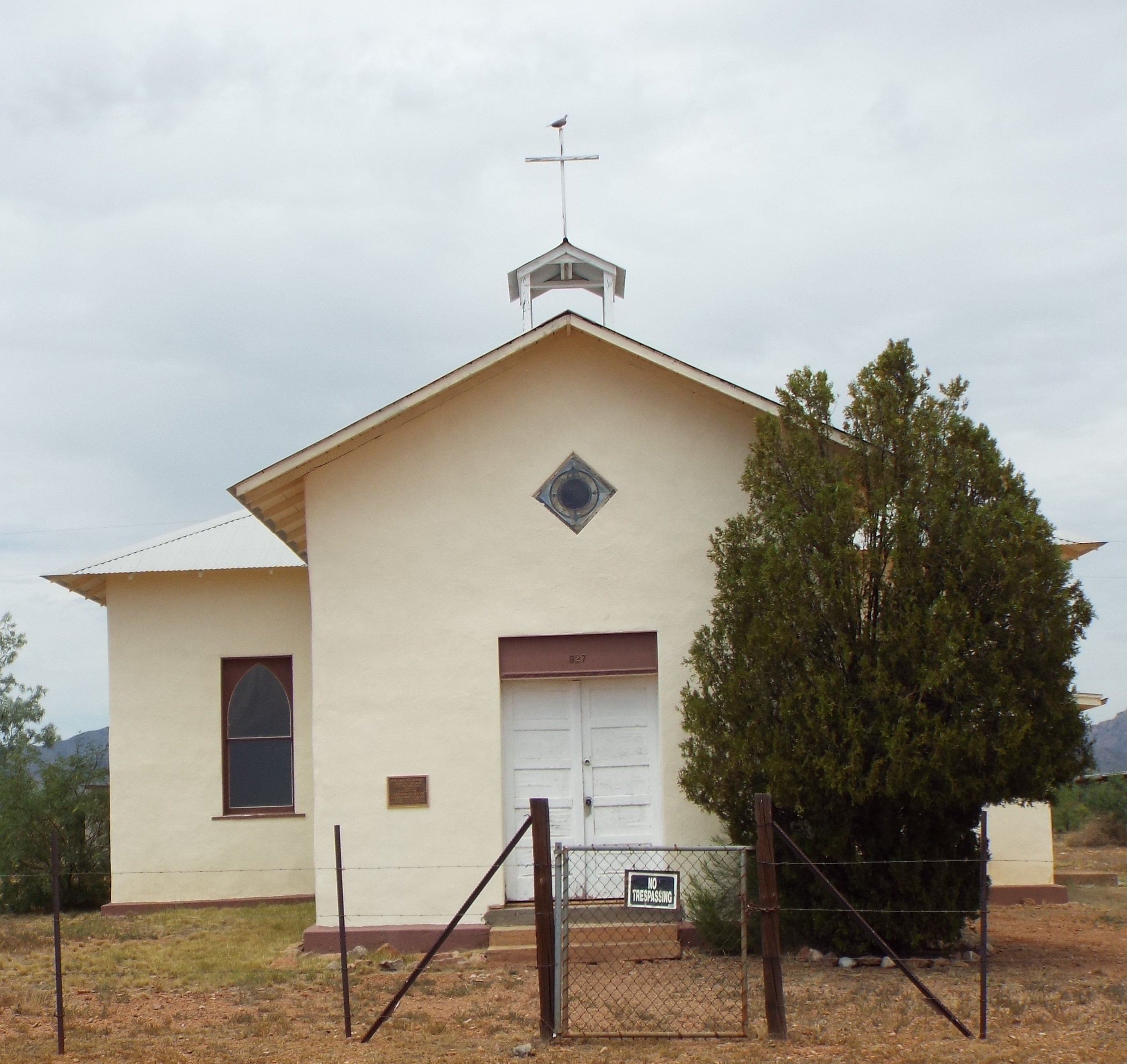
- The church in 2019

- Location within Arizona Location within the United States
- Location: 4th Street, between Cedar and Spruce Streets, Pearce, Arizona
- Coordinates: 31°54′15″N 109°49′19″W
- NRHP reference No.: 04000718
- Added to NRHP: July 21, 2004

Our Lady of Victory Catholic Church is a historic church located in Pearce, Arizona. It was added to the National Register of Historic Places in 2004.

== Description ==
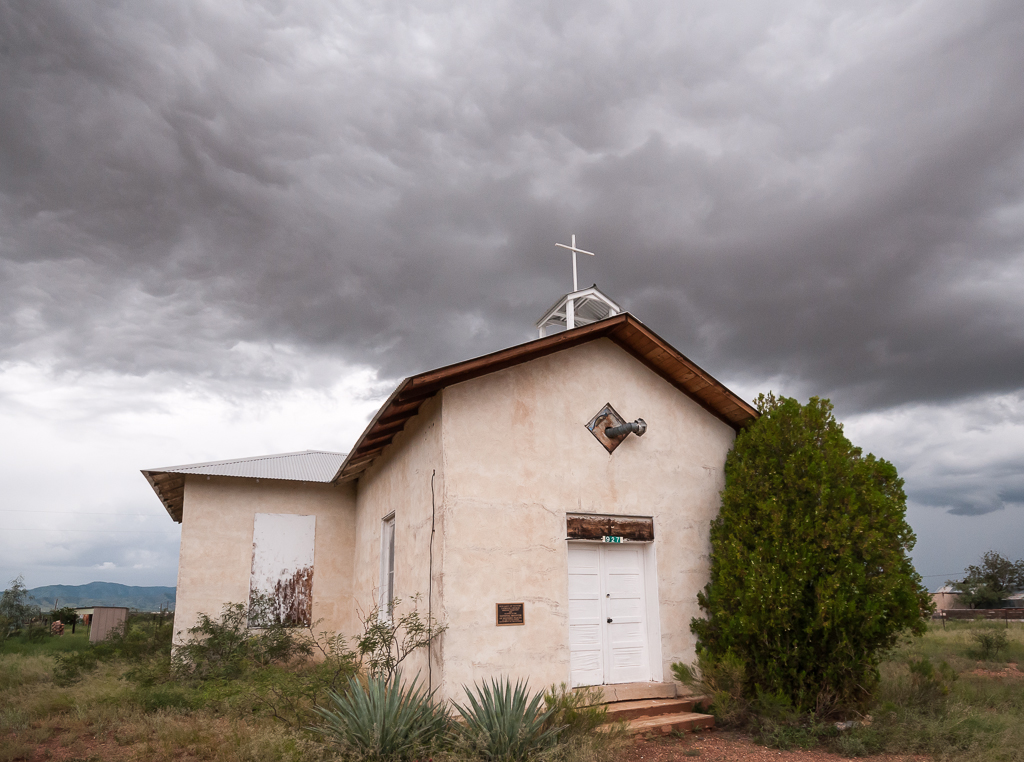
The church in 2010

The building is one of only three extant buildings from the era when Pearce was a thriving community between 1900-1920s. Unlike other southwestern states, Arizona contains very few rural vernacular adobe churches. In addition, of the 1,032 adobe buildings on the NRHP, only 15 are churches.

The church is constructed of adobe, and covers approximately 1200 square feet in a cruciform plan. There is a cupola-style belfry over the gabled entrance. The interior walls and ceiling are plaster, and it has a tongue and groove hardwood floor. The only portion of the roof which is gabled is that over the entry, while the other three roof sections have hipped roofs, covered with corrugated steel. A non-historic addition was added at some point, 14 foot by 14 foot, inserted in the northwest quadrant of the cuneiform. It has a concrete foundation, and walls of cement stucco.

== History ==
The church was constructed sometime during 1916–1917, and is part of the post-territorial adobe revival period. In early 20th century America, there were typically one of three types of churches: Parish, Mission, or Station. Parish churches had a building and a resident priest; Mission churches had a building, but not a resident priest, instead being served by a visiting priest from a nearby parish; while Station churches had neither a resident priest nor a building, instead the visiting priest would hold services in whatever building/space was available. As of 1900, Pearce was a station of Benson. Over the years their status changed to stations of Nogales and Solomonville. After construction of this church, it became a mission of Solomonville, then in 1918 its mission was changed to Tombstone. The church was little used during the 1930s, and little is known of it during the 1940s and 1950s, but by 1961 it was no longer in use. When the town of Sunsites was established nearby in 1961, the area's population began to increase, and by 1963 the church was back in service. It remained in service until 1969 when increasing numbers prompted the construction of St. Jude's, about four miles to the north. The church's bell was transferred to the new structure. The Diocese of Tucson sold the building to private parties.
