= John Gung'l House =

- U.S. National Register of Historic Places
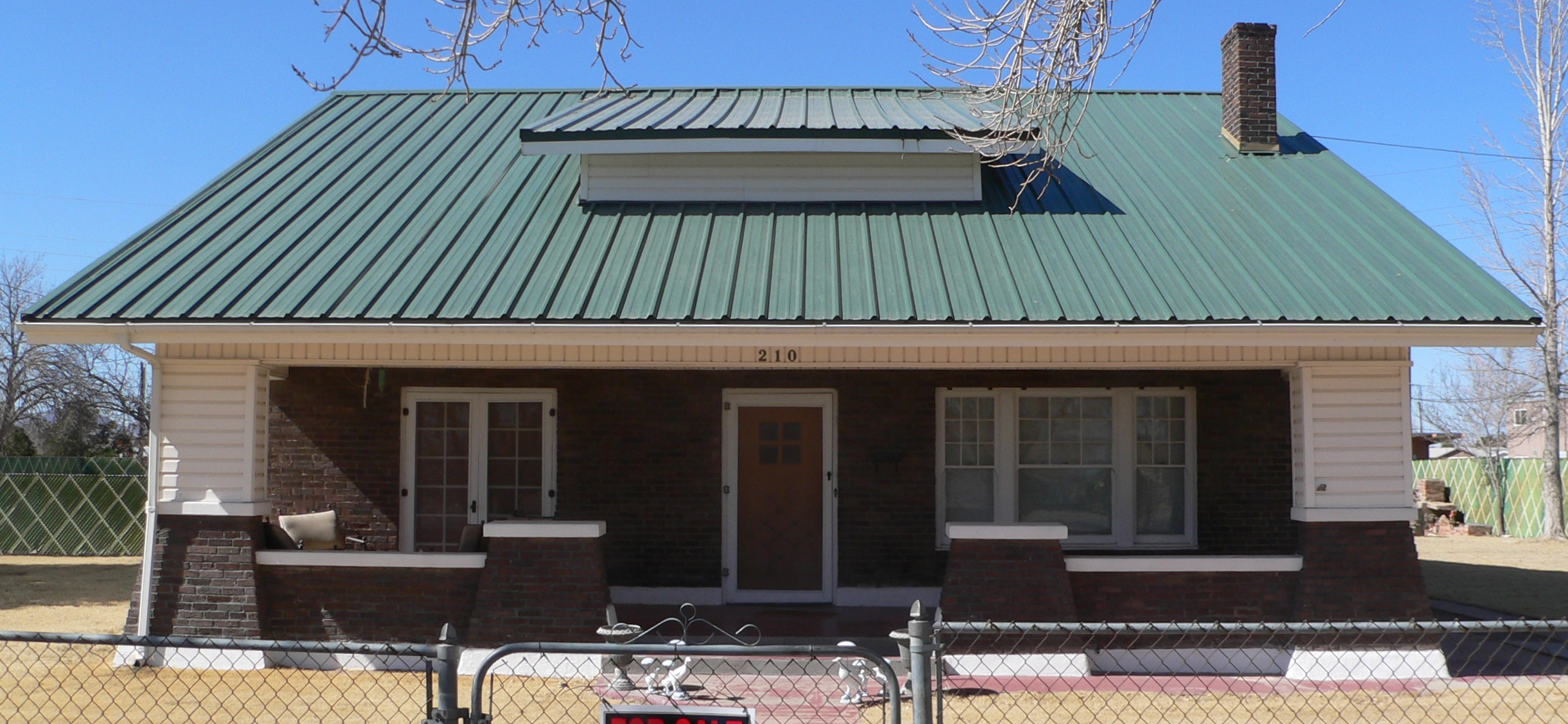
- View from the southeast

- Location within Arizona Location within the United States
- Location: 210 South El Paso Avenue Willcox, Arizona
- Coordinates: 32°15′10″N 109°50′13″W
- NRHP reference No.: 87000749
- Added to NRHP: May 27, 1987

The John Gung'l House is a historic house in Willcox, Arizona, which is listed on the National Register of Historic Places.

It is a Craftsman style Bungalow, built in 1920 by John Gung'l, a prominent local attorney and the local water company owner. The bricks were imported from El Paso, Texas. It has a high gable roof, a central shed dormer in front with two lights, and a corbelled chimney. It has exposed rafters and wooden shingles. Its main entry is a central, wood panel door with a single light and a wood screen door. The first-floor veranda is recessed, with paired wood columns on elephantine pedestals. It sits on a concrete foundation.
