= Johnson-Tillotson House =

- U.S. National Register of Historic Places
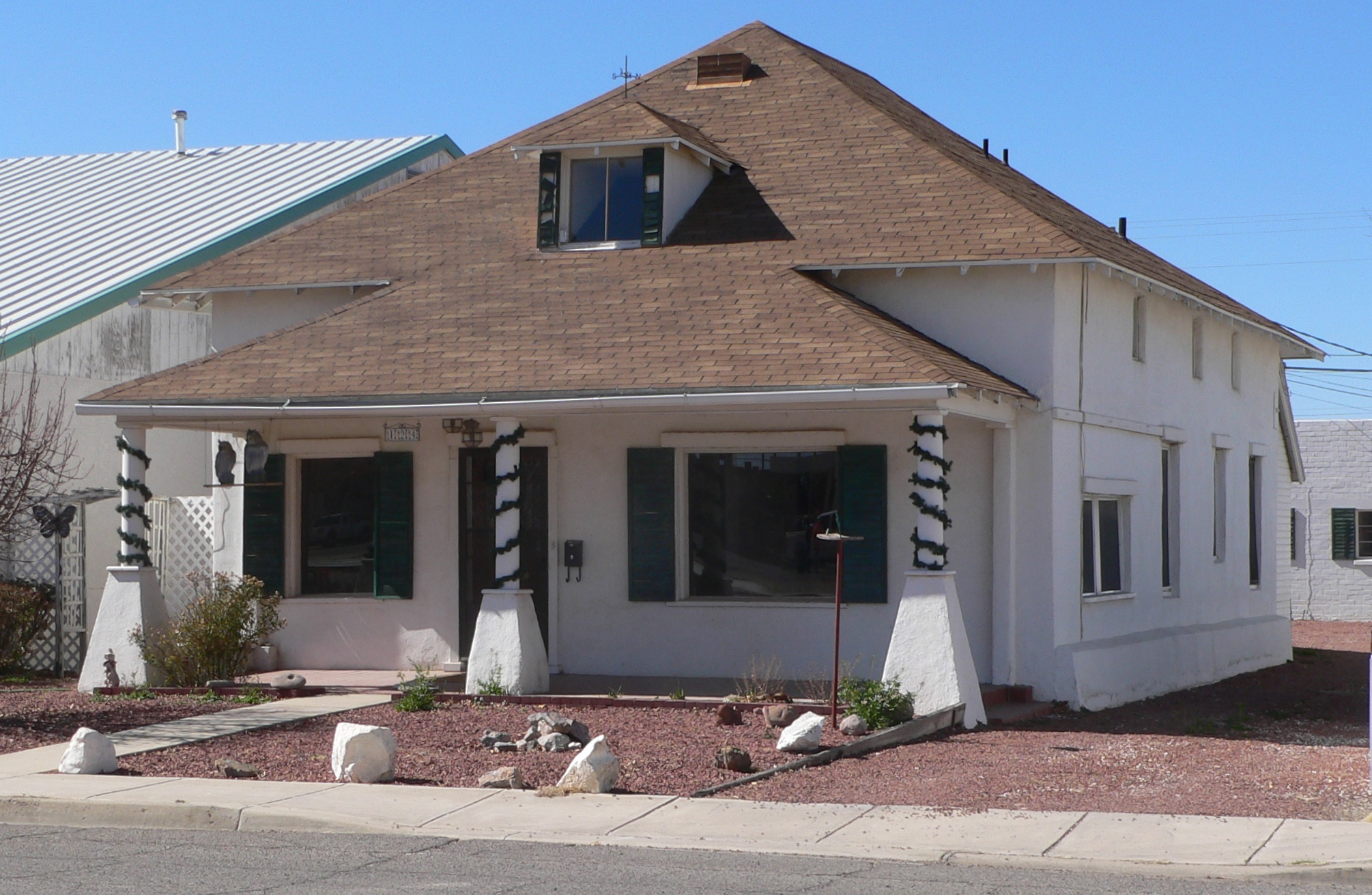

- Location within Arizona Location within the United States
- Location: 124 North Curtis Street, Willcox, Arizona
- Coordinates: 32°15′13″N 109°50′01″W
- NRHP reference No.: 87000743
- Added to NRHP: August 6, 1987

The Johnson-Tillotson House is a Western Colonial Revival home located in Willcox, Arizona, originally built circa in1900 by the Johnson family, a local ranching family, as their in-town residence. It is an adobe structure, in a 2-story Queen Anne architecture. It has a wood shingled high hipped roof, with boxed cornice eaves. The main entry is an off-centered plain lintel wood door, with a wooden screen. And the porch is a recessed platform with no railing, and its own gabled roof.
