= Hi Wo Company Grocery =

- U.S. National Register of Historic Places
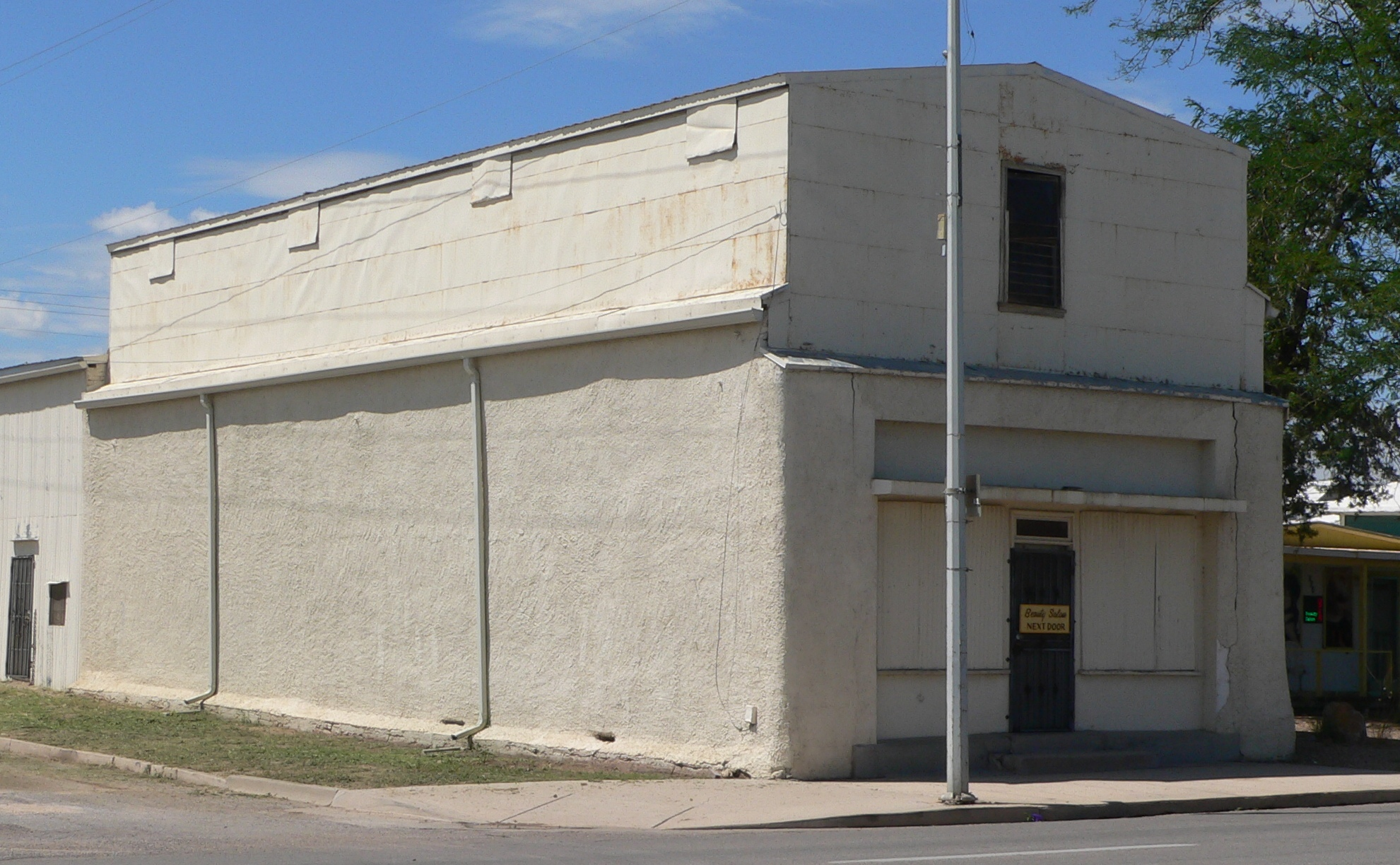

- Location within Arizona Location within the United States
- Location: 398 East 4th Street, Benson, Arizona
- Coordinates: 31°58′03″N 110°17′35″W
- NRHP reference No.: 94000074
- Added to NRHP: March 6, 1998

The Hi Wo Company Grocery is a building in Benson, Arizona. While it opened in 1896, its actual date of construction is unknown; it was one of the first commercial buildings in Benson. The store remained in operation until 1989, operated by descendants of Hi Wo, the first owner, an immigrant from China.

The building is located at the southwest corner of Gila and East 4th Street, on a 25 by 150 foot lot, and was constructed on the front lot line, spanning from both side boundaries. It is a two-story structure with a basement. There is an adobe foundation which support the exterior main floor walls, while redwood piers are the support for the second story. The first story walls are of adobe masonry, while the second has lighter walls made of redwood frame construction, sheathed with metal panels. There is a gable roof, sheathed with sheet metal. In 1965, an addition was put on the house, made of stucco-frame construction. Prior to the addition the building was rectangular, with a symmetrical facade on East 4th street, and a central door with a single light, flanked by storefront windows and a transom above. The second story was added in the 1930s, and the gabled roof had a centrally placed vent door, which sat directly over the main entrance on the main floor. The staircases to both the second floor and the basement were located on the southern side, while built-in shelving, cabinets, and counters occupied the east and west walls. The second floor interior had redwood paneling. The basement was used for storage, including a walk-in cheese storage.
