= Douglas Sonoran Historic District =

- U.S. National Register of Historic Places
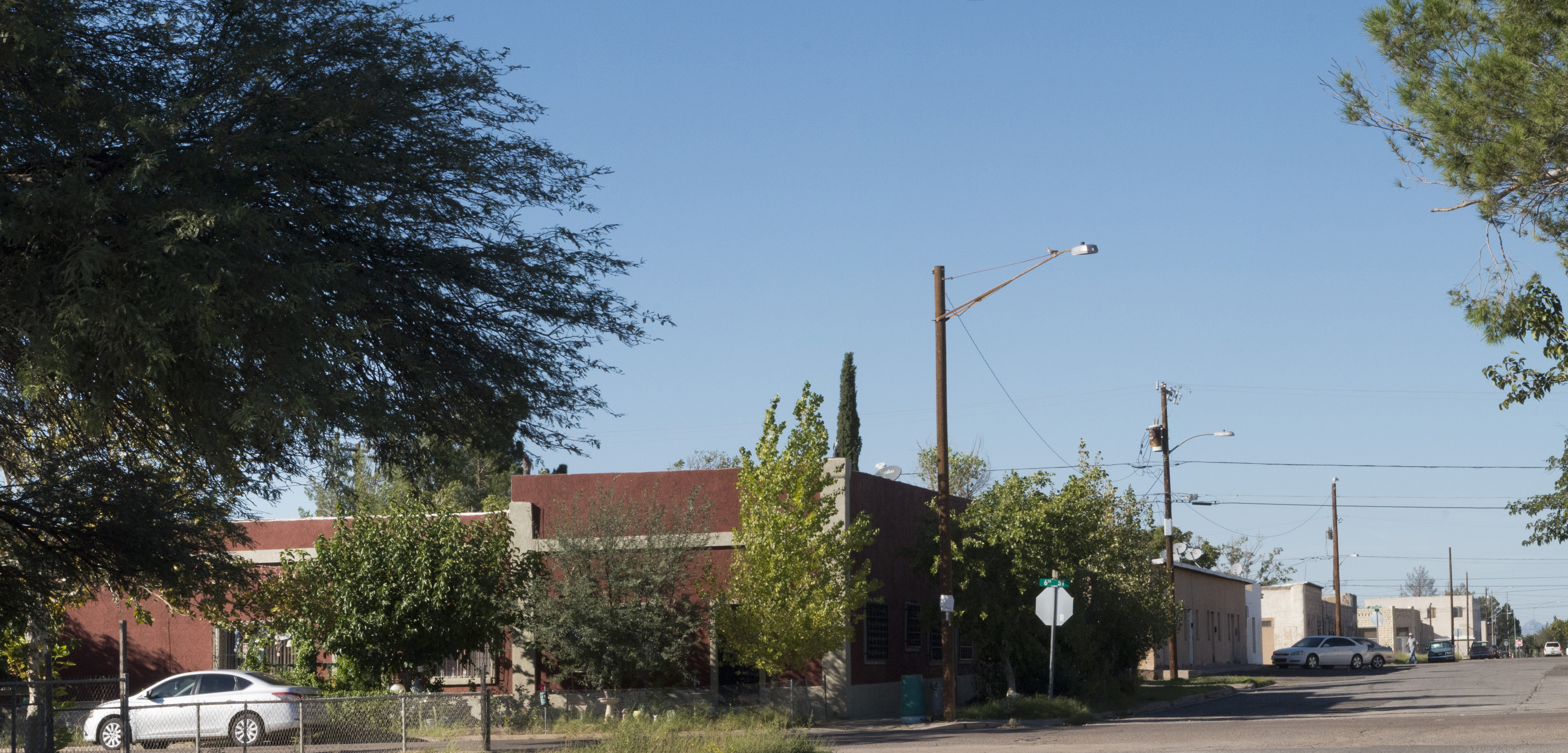
- H Avenue, looking north

- Location within Arizona Location within the United States
- Location: Douglas, Arizona
- Coordinates: 31°20′47″N 109°32′30″W
- NRHP reference No.: 87001793
- Added to NRHP: August 26, 1987

The Douglas Sonoran Historic District, called the Sonoran District, is an historic district located in Douglas, Arizona. It is southwest of the business district, its rough boundaries are H Avenue on the west, from 6th to 9th Street, consisting of contiguous flush-fronted, single story, Sonoran tradition row buildings built between 1901 and 1935. The majority of the buildings were constructed using local gypsum-cast stone. This is the largest number of cast-stone buildings in the state. The District includes twenty-one buildings, of which seventeen are contributing structures.

== Historical context ==
Douglas was established due to the mining operations of the Phelps-Dodge Company. They operated mines in Bisbee, Arizona and Nacozari in Sonora, Mexico. The site of Douglas lies approximately midway between the two, and they built their Copper Queen smelter in Douglas. In addition, the Arizona Mining Company also built a smelter in Douglas. The two companies eventually worked together to lay out the grid plan for the Douglas townsite. The railway arrived in 1901, with a depot constructed on Pan American Avenue.

The most significant era of growth of the town was between 1901 and 1930, when copper mining was booming in Arizona. Both the downtown commercial and residential areas were developed during this timeframe. When Arizona became a state in 1912, Douglas was the largest city, and Cochise County was the most populous county. That year, Douglas produced more the $26 million in metals. Its proximity to the international border made it a center for commercial trade between the two nations.

The town reached its peak population in 1917, with 17,875 people, with the largest employers in town being the two smelters and the El Paso and Southwestern railroad. After World War I there was downturn in the copper industry, due to the large stockpiles which had been accrued during the war. Both of the town's smelters closed down for almost a year, but by 1922 they were both re-opened, and there was a resurgence in copper which lasted until the crash of 1929.

Some of the town's first settlers were several Lebanese families, who settled near Ninth and H Avenues, mostly operating family businesses such as grocery, produce and feed stores. The neighborhood was very densely populated, and consisted of small houses and Sonoran row houses (flats). Many of the businesses were run out of their homes. The row houses provided inexpensive housing for Douglas laborers. due to the boom and influx of workers, investors built the flats between the railroad tracks, international border, and G Avenue.

Douglas was a typical mining town and many of the businesses catered to single men who worked in the smelters and for the railroad. By 1905 the town contained seventy-five saloons. A red-light district developed around Sixth Street, with as many as two hundred prostitutes working south of Sixth and west of H Avenues. Since the end of the copper boom in the 1930s, few changes have impacted Douglas' historic buildings, and quite a few have been listed in the National Register of Historic Places, including the Douglas Municipal Airport, Gadsden Hotel, Grand Theatre, El Paso and Southwestern Railroad YMCA, and the Douglas Post Office and Customs, as well as the Douglas Historic District and the Douglas Residential Historic District.

== Description of the District ==
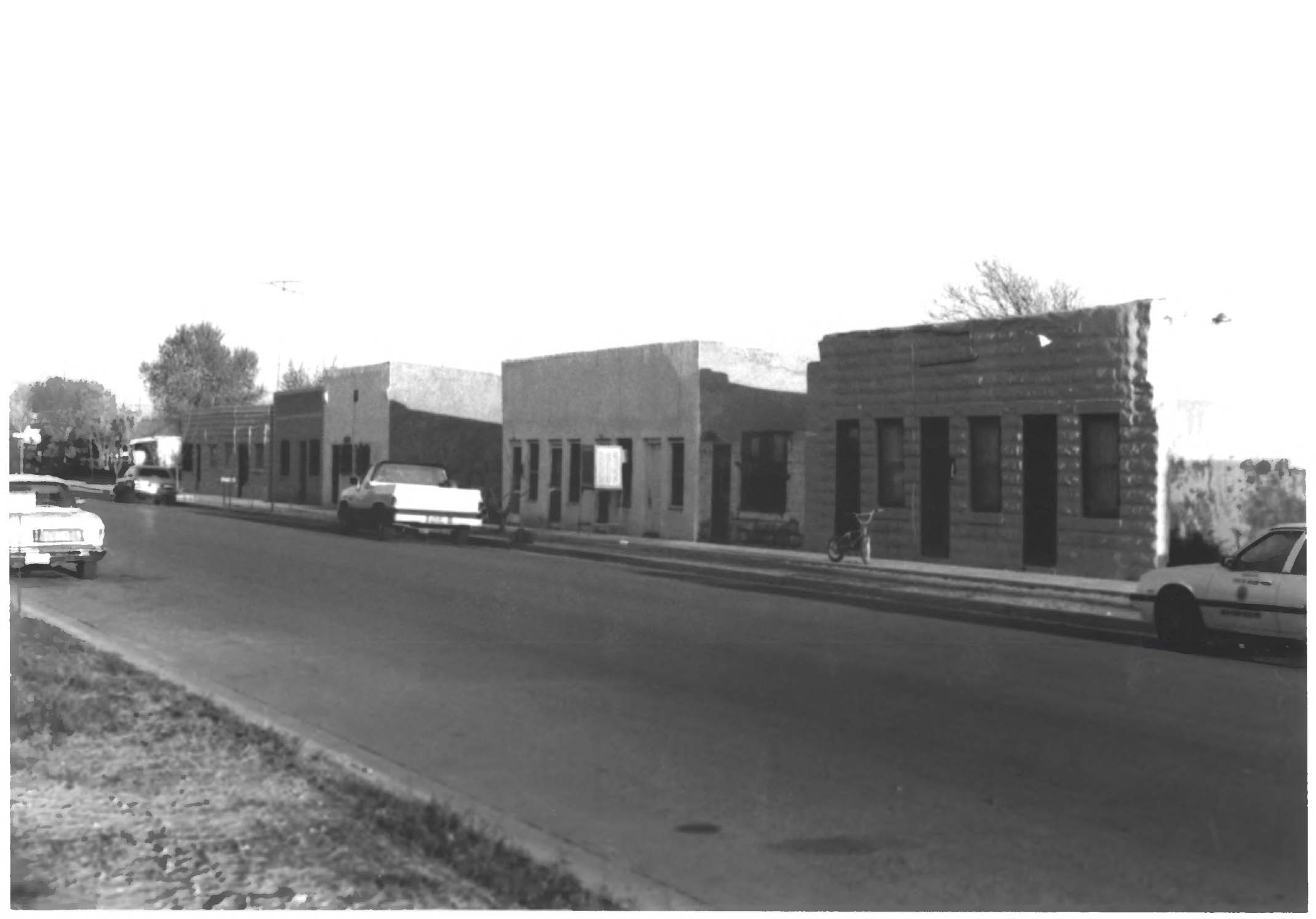
Douglas Sonoran Historic District, Green Street

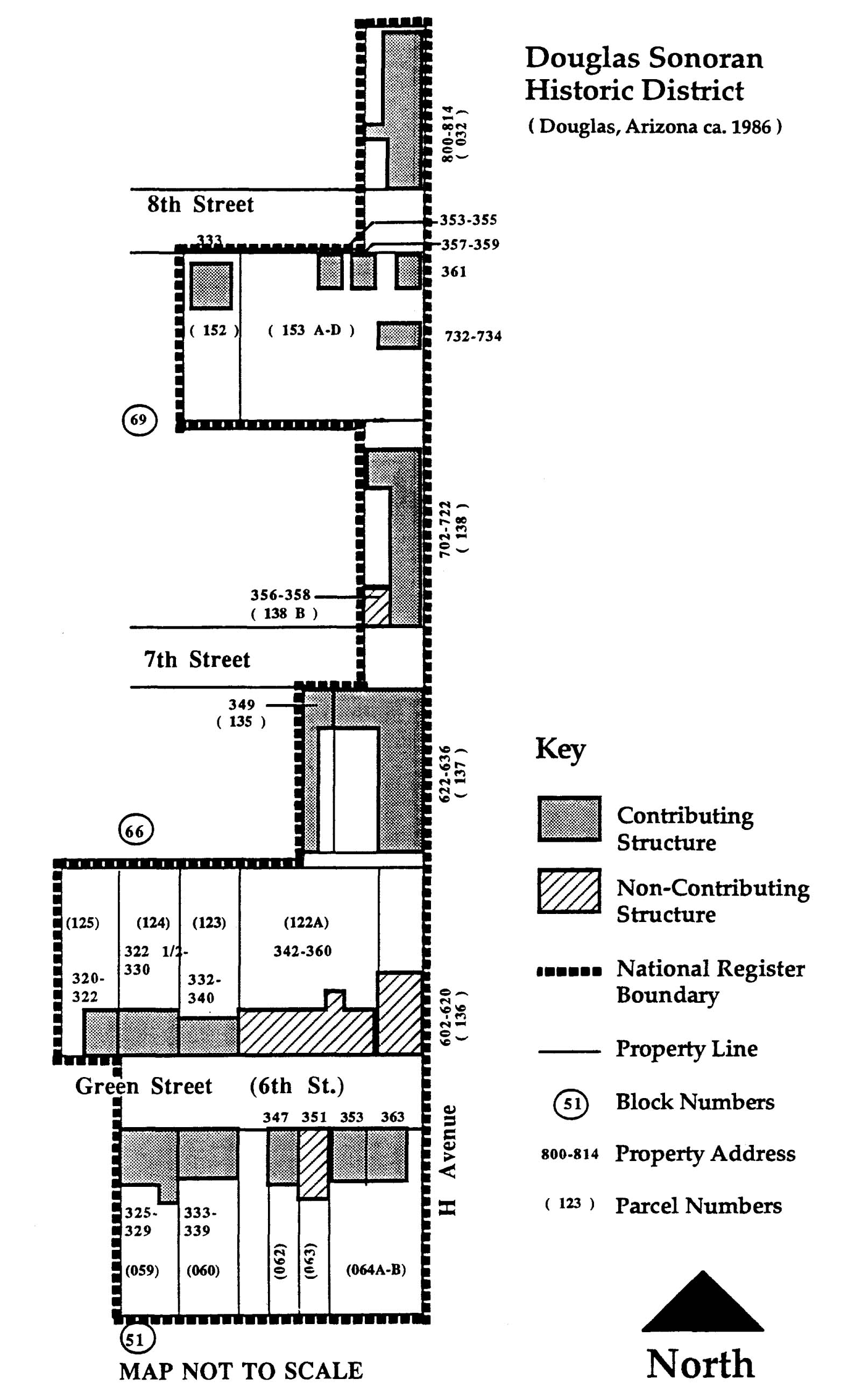
Map of Douglas Sonoran Historic District

The district is composed of buildings along the west side of H Avenue from Sixth Street on the south to the alley between Eighth and Ninth Streets on the north. The curb line of H Avenue provides the eastern boundary of the district. The western edge is located toward the middle of several blocks along the western property line; of contributing properties. This area.contains the only remaining significant concentration of Sonoran style buildings, in Douglas. The district possesses a continuity of buildings united by a similar architectural style.

To the north of the district, the area changes rapidly with modern buildings ringing the governmental and civic center of Douglas where municipal buildings are located. To the east, the character of the area outside the district shifts toward newer residential buildings that, in turn, give way to commercial structures along G Avenue, the central business thoroughfare of Douglas. South of the district, the area beyond the boundary is composed of modern residential buildings with commercial and government buildings along the international boundary with Mexico, To the west, the area outside the district boundary contains vacant land along Pan American Avenue leading to the border crossing into Agua Prieta, Mexico.

Sidewalks are not common in this district. Because building forms are set directly at the front property line, there is insufficient space for developed landscapes. However, there are street trees along Sixth Street. H Avenue has trees planted in the extended roadway, recalling the early streetscape character of traditional Sonoran Barrios. Streets in the district conform to a grid plan.

=== Characteristics of the Sonoran style ===
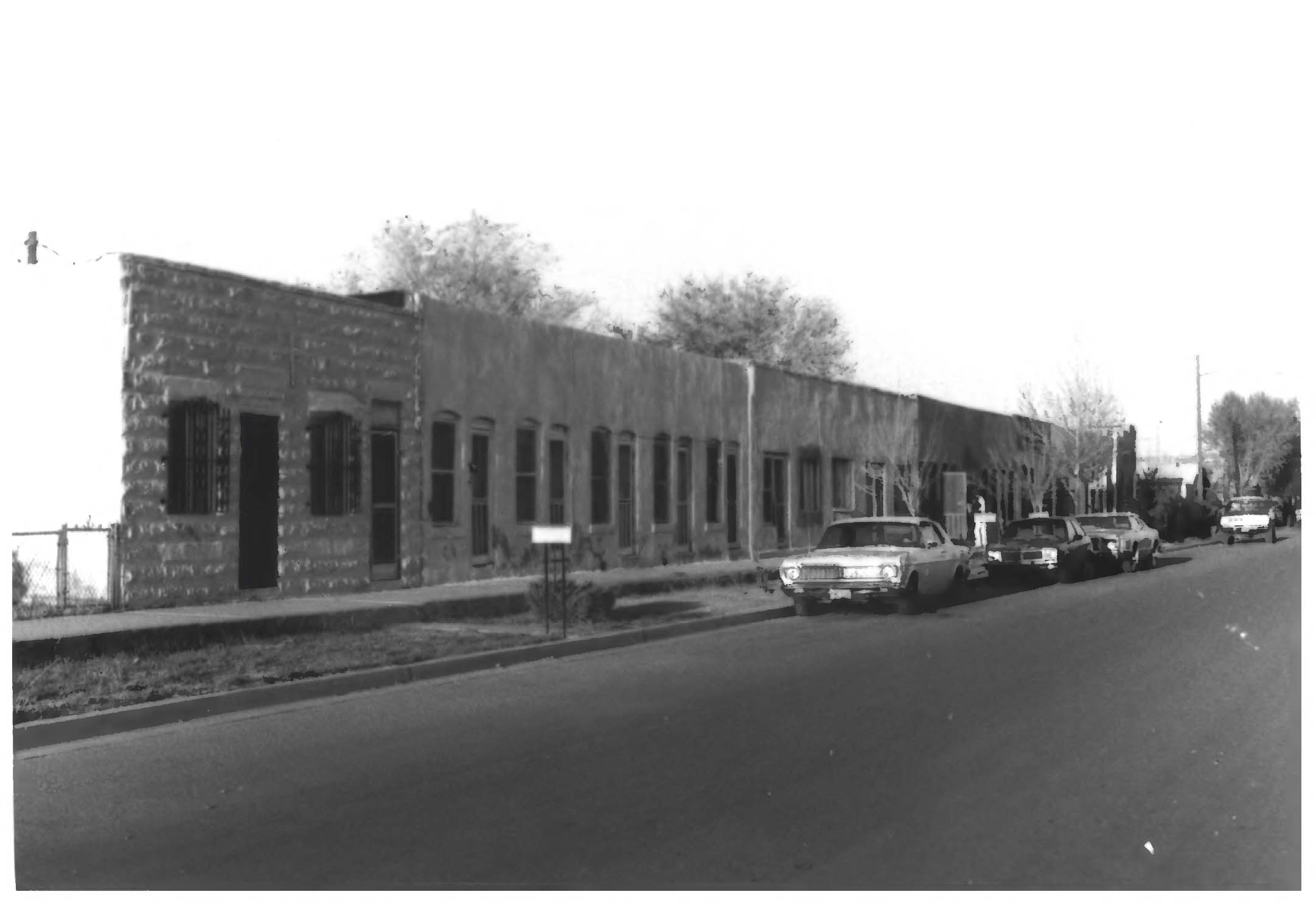
Douglas Sonoran Historic District, Green Street

The buildings in the Douglas Sonoran District are typical Sonoran tradition row buildings once common in the southern portion of the state and in the northern Mexican state of Sonora. The buildings do not follow a standard architectural style, but are best understood as vernacular representatives of the Sonoran, building tradition once common in the area. This tradition has been the subject of scholarly study in Arizona by architect Harris Sobin and is examined at length in his book Florence Townsite, A.T. In contrast to Florence, the uniqueness of the Douglas Sonoran District lies in its abundance of gypsum cast-stone units utilized for construction. The Sonoran rowhouse tradition is also evident in Tucson's Barrio Historico, but in that case, adobe is the primary material.

The basic characteristics of the Sonoran row building are a flat roof, wall parapet, and no street setback. The parapet is often topped with a cap row of brick or block. These flush-fronted structures are set contiguous on the front property line. Facades are composed of alternating rhythm of windows and doors, reflecting the interior composition of small units. Wood frames, sash, and doors are common. Doors are often topped with transoms. Simplified brick detailing appears on some buildings. Concrete or cast-stone lintels and sills are common. While projecting porches were once common, especially along Sixth Street and at the comer of H Avenue and Eighth Street, only a few buildings retain these features today (732-734 H Avenue, 357-359 Eighth Street, and 353-355 Eighth Street).

Locally produced gypsum cast-stone units were used in construction in the vast majority of the buildings. For contributing buildings, twelve are constructed of cast-stone, three are constructed of brick, and two are constructed of adobe. Douglas boasts the largest known concentration of cast-stone buildings in the state. Entire ranges of buildings in the Sonoran District were constructed in cast-stone. In some cases, the cast-stone served as a facing for traditional adobe construction. Also in the district are a few brick faced translations of the traditional Sonoran building. An unusual feature in this district of uniform, anonymous facades is the building at 349 Seventh Street, which boasts a brick facade with a dominant Palladian motif. From all appearances, this detail was integral to the original construction. The cast-stone bricks were manufactured locally by the Arizona Gypsum Plaster Co. The block units were formed with gypsum extracted from Arizona's only gypsum mine, situated north of Douglas. The softness of the gypsum block meant that the property owners customarily painted the material. Cast stone remained a popular building material until the late 1930s when the manufacturing plant closed its operations.
