= Garden Canyon Archeological Site =

- U.S. National Register of Historic Places
- Location: Sierra Vista, Arizona
- NRHP reference No.: 75000338
- Added to NRHP: October 29, 1975

- Garden Canyon Petroglyphs
- U.S. National Register of Historic Places
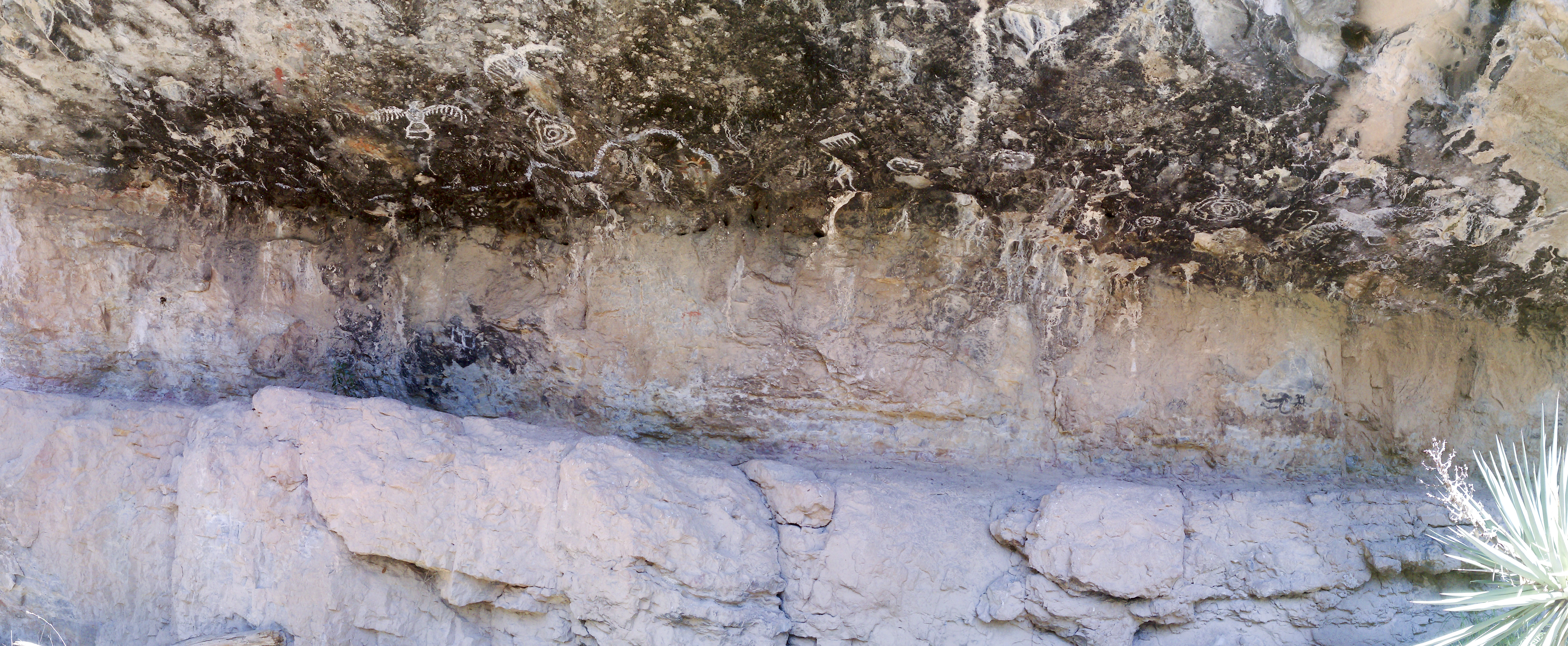
- Location: Sierra Vista, Arizona
- NRHP reference No.: 74000444
- Added to NRHP: July 30, 1974

The Garden Canyon Archeological Site is an archeological site near Sierra Vista, Arizona. It is an undated and mostly unexcavated archeological site which includes an Indian village with both pithouses and above-ground dwellings. There are also burial sites, and in a nearby cave, petroglyphs. The location is not publicized to protect the integrity of the site. It is located south of Sierra Vista, off of AZ 92, on the Fort Huachuca Military Base.

Very close by, in a cave, are the Garden Canyon Petroglyphs, a separately listed place on the NHRP. They are carved on the caves ceiling which is located on a bluff several hundred feet above the canyon.
