= Schilling Ranch Historic District =

- U.S. National Register of Historic Places
- Location within Arizona Location within the United States
- Location: 6396 N. Schilling Ranch Road, Cochise County, Arizona
- Coordinates: 32°19′55″N 110°07′19″W
- Area: 2 acres (0.81 ha)
- MPS: Cattle Ranching in Arizona in the Modern Era, 1945-1970
- NRHP reference No.: 09000608
- Added to NRHP: August 7, 2009

The Schilling Ranch Historic District is a tiny portion of a historic ranch in Cochise County, Arizona which was listed on the National Register of Historic Places in 2009. It consists of several structures built in the early to mid-1900s. It is representative of the infrastructure required by cattle ranching operations in the Southwestern United States. It was used as a central location for cattle roundups from the surrounding cattle ranches, before shipment to the Willcox cattle auctions.

The 2 acres (0.81 ha) district consists of five structures: a farmhouse, a bunkhouse, a corral, a tack room, and a hay barn. All were constructed between 1927 through 1959.

Historically, what is now the historic district was part of the larger Winchester Ranch, which was used for cattle ranching throughout the twentieth century. The Winchester Ranch, in turn, had been part of the vast land holdings of Henry Clay Hooker, called the Sierra Bonita Ranch, during the 1800s However, the historic district is the part of the ranch which symbolizes cattle ranching in Arizona during the first half of the century.

In 1906, a year before his death, Hooker sold the Muleshoe Ranch, of which the Winchester Ranch was part of, to Deming Isaacson. At about this time, Ernest Schilling was homesteading that portion of the Muleshoe known as the Winchester, and the ranch became known as the Schilling Ranch. Schilling expanded his holdings through the 1920s, and became locally known for his purebred cattle. In 1933, one of his Hereford bulls became the top prizewinner of the Century of Progress Exposition in Chicago. The ranch house used by Schilling was not the same as the current ranch house in the Historic District. Schilling's ranch house burned down in the mid-1970s.

In 1940, the manager of the Muleshoe Ranch, Elvie Lane, purchased Schilling's ranch. Eight years later, Lane sold the ranch to Ernest Browning, who would later also purchase the Muleshoe Ranch. Browning was well known among the quarter-horse set, helping to organize the American Quarter Horse Association in 1940. In 1982 he was awarded the National Livestock Association's "Golden Spur Award" for his contributions to the nation's livestock and ranching industries. Also in 1942, he was inducted into the American Quarter Horse Hall of Fame. He was also co-founder of the National Cowboy Hall of Fame.

The ranch house in the Historic District was known as the "Rock House". Browning's son, Alvin, and his wife, Lavinia, moved into the house in 1949, to run the ranch for his father. Shortly afterwards, Alvin and his ranch hands built the bunk house, hay barn and tack room. The Rock House was occupied until the mid-1970s, and in 1980 Alvin sold it to his two sons, Eddie and Jack. Eddie and Jack worked the ranch until 1988, when they sold it to Tommie Todd, who sold it in 2003 to Louise and Dale Henderson.

The 2009 NRHP listing of the property was consistent with requirements detailed in a 1970 study.
