= Mountain View Officers' Club =

Historic military officers' club for African American soldiers in Arizona, United States

- U.S. National Register of Historic Places
- U.S. Historic district – Contributing property
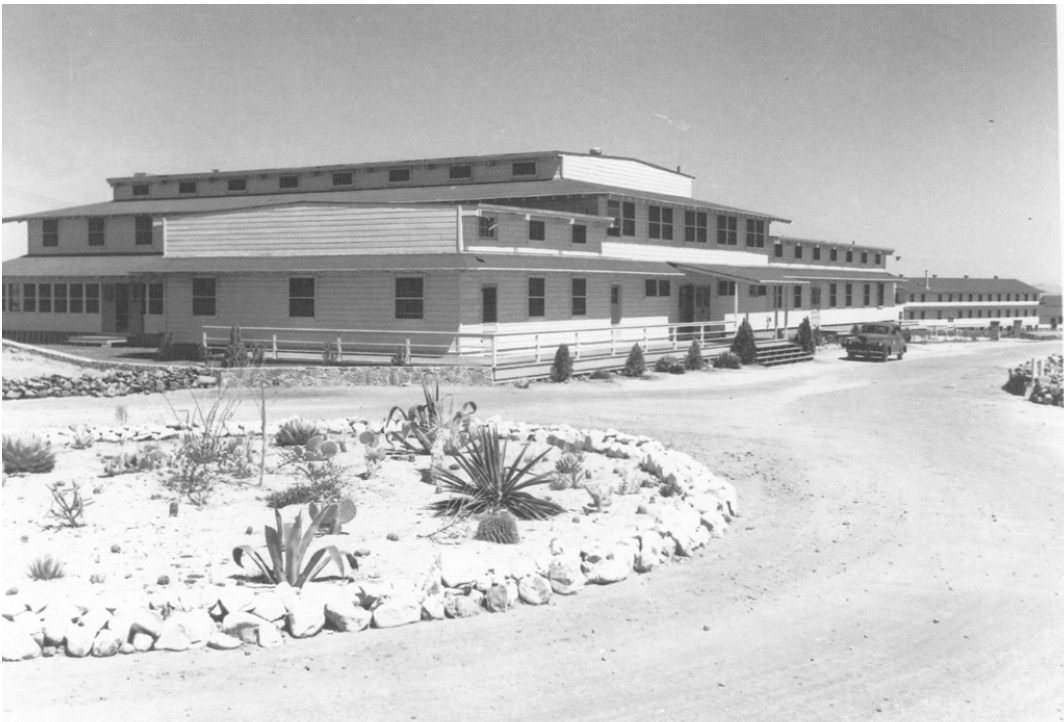

- Location within Arizona Location within the United States
- Location: Kilbourn Ave., Fort Huachuca, Arizona
- Coordinates: 31.54584°N 110.33669°W
- Area: less than one acre
- Built: 1942
- Built by: Del E. Webb Construction Company
- Architect: White and Miller, Inc.
- NRHP reference No.: 100000549
- Added to NRHP: January 24, 2017

Mountain View Officers' Club, built in 1942, is a historic structure that originally served as an officers' club for African American soldiers stationed at Fort Huachuca, Arizona. It was long vacant, but was listed on the National Register of Historic Places in 2017 and there have been plans for its renovation.

== History ==
Fort Huachuca had the highest number of African American soldiers at any military installation in the United States between the years of 1892 and 1946.

In 1942, the Mountain View Officers' Club was one of 1,400 buildings built to accommodate Fort Huachuca's Black infantry divisions. The club is the fort's only surviving recreational facility from this time.

The club was vacated in 1998 and has since faced multiple threats of demolition.

== Restoration efforts ==
It was listed on the National Register of Historic Places in 2017 as a result of two years of discussions between the U.S. Army authorities at Fort Huachuca, the National Trust for Historic Preservation, the Arizona State Historic Preservation Office, the Arizona Preservation Foundation, the Tucson Historic Preservation Foundation, and other consulting parties.

The listing included one contributing building and four contributing structures.

In 2018, Arizona State Parks and Trails received $500,000 from the National Park Service’s African American Civil Rights Fund for the purpose of restoring the club. The National Trust for Historic Preservation's African-American Cultural Heritage Action Fund has also supported restoration efforts with a 2018 grant. Additional financial supporters have included the Pascua Yaqui tribe and Buffalo Soldier organizations.

In January 2023, Fort Huachuca signed a programmatic agreement for the rehabilitation of the Mountain View Officers' Club. A viable plan to rehabilitate the building as a Range Operations Synchronization Center is moving forward and has been submitted for Army funding consideration. The rehabilitation plan also provides exhibit space for consulting parties to tell the story of the Black World War II military experience.
