= List of historic properties in Pearce, Arizona =

- CDP
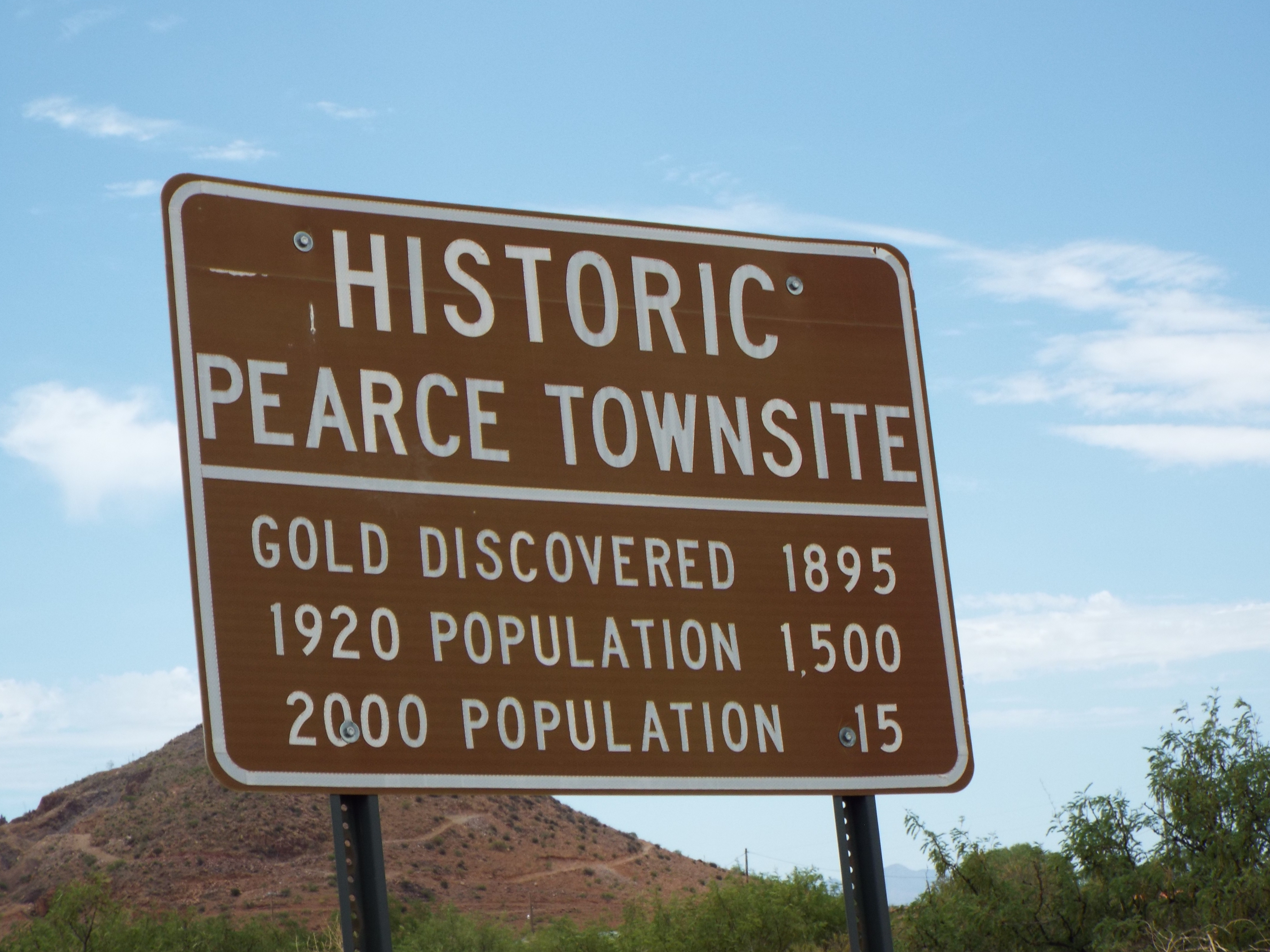
- Historic Pearce Townsite
- Interactive map of List of historic properties in Pearce, Arizona
- Coordinates: 31°54′18″N 109°49′14″W

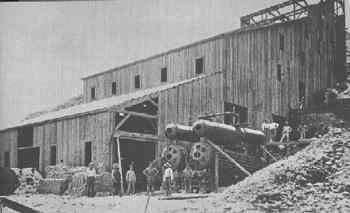
The mill at Fittsburg, c.1900.

This is a list of historic properties in Pearce, Arizona a former mining town which is now a census-designated area located between the Cochise Stronghold and the Chiricahua National Monument. Pearce was once a thriving mining town which depended on the nearby Commonwealth Mine, a gold and silver mine and later became a ghost town after the mines were depleted. Included is a photographic gallery of some of the remaining historic structures, two of which are individually identified as historic by the National Register of Historic Places. .

== Brief history ==
According to Archaeological findings Pearce and the surrounding area of what is now Cochise County was inhabited by the Clovis Man, the name given to the members of the prehistoric Paleoamerican culture the Clovis culture, until the end of the last Ice Age. Other tribes such as the Anasazi people, the Hohokam and the Agrarians later resided in the area up until 1400 AD. Spanish explorers led by Don Francisco Vazquez de Coronado entered Cochise County in search of the “Seven Cities of Cibola” where according to Spanish legend, the streets were paved with gold. By then the area was inhabited by the members of the Solado tribe. By 1700 the Solado's were eventually driven out of the area by the Apaches. The Apaches did not like the colonization of their lands by the Spaniards and didn't want to be converted to a new religion (Christianity). By 1775, the Apaches had driven the Spaniards out.

James Pearce and his wife lived in the town of Tombstone where he worked the mines while his wife managed a boarding house. The Pearce family, which included two sons and a daughter, decided to move to Sulphur Springs Valley, where they established a ranch with the money that they had saved. James Pearce and his sons were busy with their ranching activities when the elder Pearce decided to take a rest. While resting he picked up a rock and threw it against a rock edge. When the rock broke he realized that the rock contained gold. He took it to an assay in Tombstone and was told that the rock in question had a high ore content of both gold and silver. The specimen was assayed at $22,000 per ton in silver and $5,000 per ton in gold. Immediately the Pearce family filed mining claims and began to work on the claims. He named his mine the "Commonwealth Mine". His sons soon told their father that they did not wish to continue working the mine and would rather return to ranching.

John Brockman, a businessman from Silver City, New Mexico, heard about the gold mine and became interested in purchasing the mine. After meeting with Pearce, he convinced him to sell the mine. Pearce reached an agreement where he would sell the mine for $250,000 with an added stipulation. The stipulation required that Brockman had 90 days to work the mine and it guaranteed that Mrs. Pearce would be the person to run a boardinghouse beside the mine. The deal between Brockman and the Pearce family was finalized and thus Brockman became the new owner of the Commonwealth Mine. It wasn't long before a small settlement called Fittsburg was established close to the mine and about one mile east of the town of Pearce.

== The town of Pearce ==
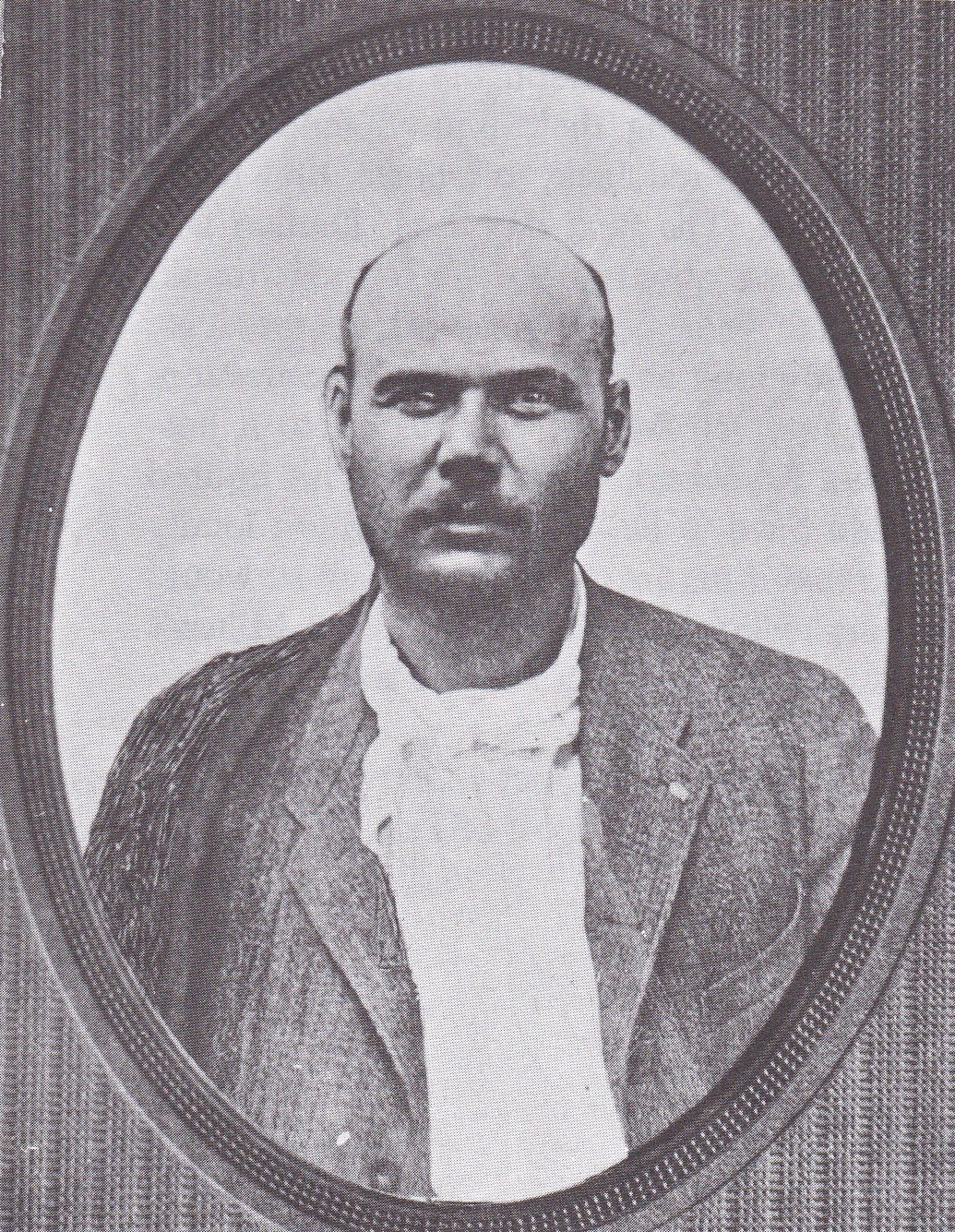
Burt Alvord

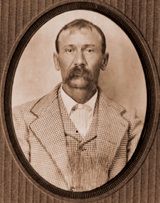
Bill Downing

In 1896, a post office was established and the town was named Pearce. Dozens of businesses from Tombstone moved to Pearce and a growth in the new towns population followed. The population of Pearce in 1919 was 1,500. Brockman built a 200-stamp mill, however criminal activities by miners and outlaws followed the path of the town's progress.

Burt Alvord was hired and named deputy by George Bravin. It wasn't long before Alvard became an outlaw who formed a gang known as the Alvord-Stiles Gang. The gang was dedicated to robbing trains throughout the Arizona Territory.They often used the town of Pearce as their headquarters. Another infamous outlaw who lived in Pearce was Bill Downing. Downing worked as a cowhand at the nearby ranches. He was hired to work in the Esperanza Ranch, a ranch which was known for hiring rustlers, outlaws and renegade Apaches. Downing became a member of the Alvord-Stiles Gang and together with the gang robbed the Cochise Train Station and attempted to rob the Fairbank train. Downing was eventually captured, tried and sentenced to a prison term in the Yuma Territorial Prison.

In 1882, close to the town of Pearce on East Turkey Creek Road, the infamous outlaw Johnny Ringo was found dead. He was found propped against a tree and shot through the head. There are many unproven theories and speculations as to if he committed suicide or was murdered. Ringo was a member of the Clanton Cowboy Gang of Tombstone when the gang was at war with Wyatt Earp, Doc Holliday and Morgan and Virgil Earp. Ringo is buried where he fell.

By 1896, the Commonwealth Mine had reached its peak in producing gold and silver. That same year the Soto Bros. and Renaud Store was built. The two-story building, which as of 2020 still stands, was built with cedar and redwood beams. Later a cast metal facade was added to the front of the building. The building, which now is known as the Pearce General Store, was one of the largest adobe structures in Cochise County. The Commonwealth Mine continued to operate until 1930 when it was depleted. The closing of the mine and the worldwide depression of the 1930s hit the once prosperous town hard and soon the residents began to move out. These two major events were the main reasons that the town became the ghost town it is today.

There are two properties in Pearce which are listed in the National Register of Historic Places, they are: Our Lady of Victory Catholic Church, listed on July 21, 2004; reference #04000718 and located on 4th St., between Cedar and Spruce Streets. and the other is the Pearce General Store; listed November 16, 1978, reference #78000541 and located on Ghost Town and Pearce Road.

== Historic structures in Pearce which are pictured ==
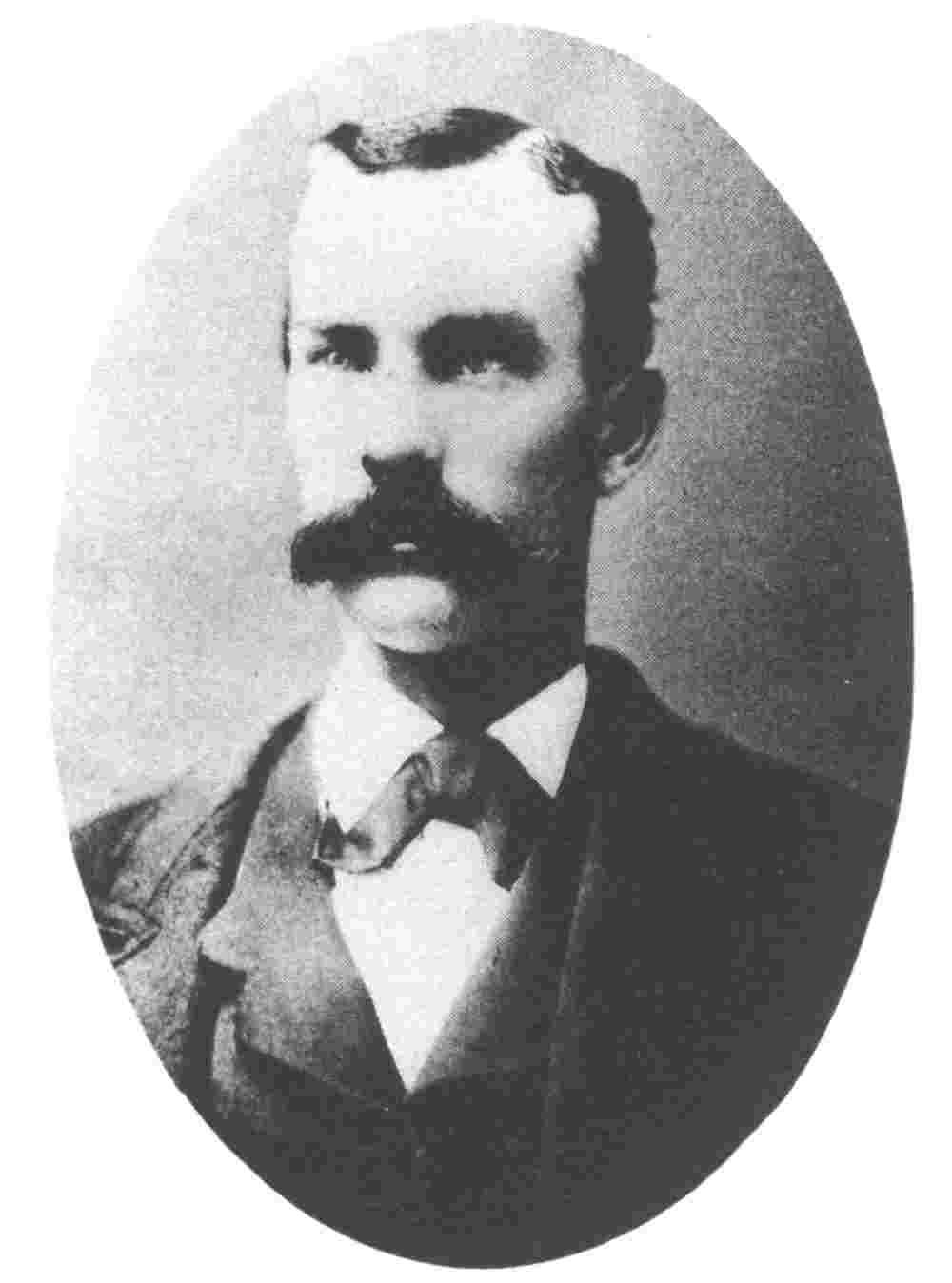
Johnny Ringo c. 1880

The historic properties in Pearce which are pictured are the following:

- The Sheriff's Office – built in 1915
- The Ruins of the Prisoners cell – built in 1915
- The Old Pearce Pottery store – built in 1899
- The Soto Bros. and Renaud Store a.k.a. Pearce General Store – built in 1896
- The Old General Store – built in 1894
- The US Post Office – built in 1896
- Our Lady of Victory Catholic Church – built in 1916
- An Old Ranch House – built in 1896
- An Old Wooden bridge over Middle March Creek – built in 1900
- The Pearce Cemetery – established in 1916

Plus:

- 19th Century ranching and farming equipment
- Johnny Ringo's grave

=== Images ===
Structures in Pearce

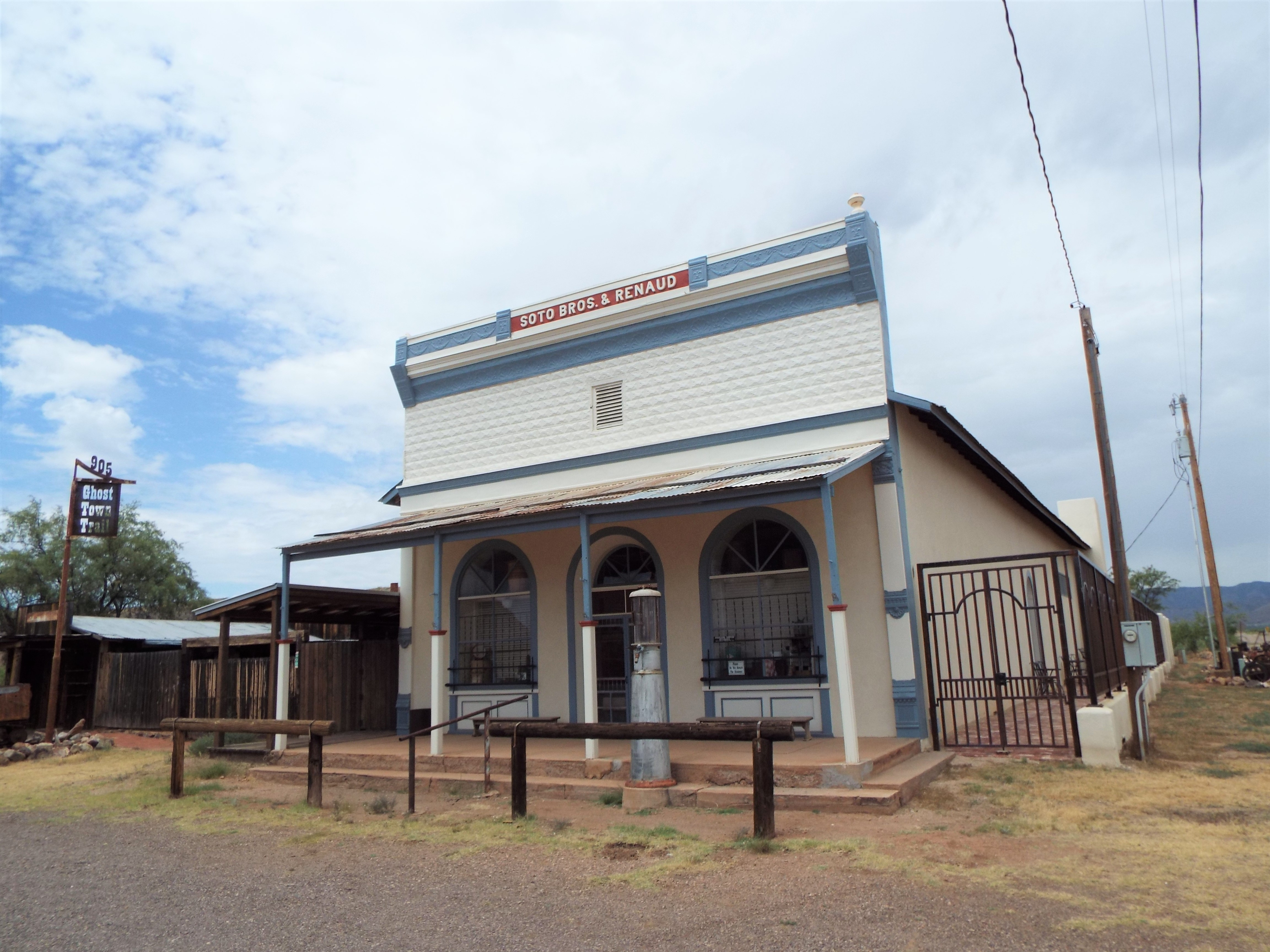
Soto Bros. and Renaud Store a.k.a. the Pearce General Store

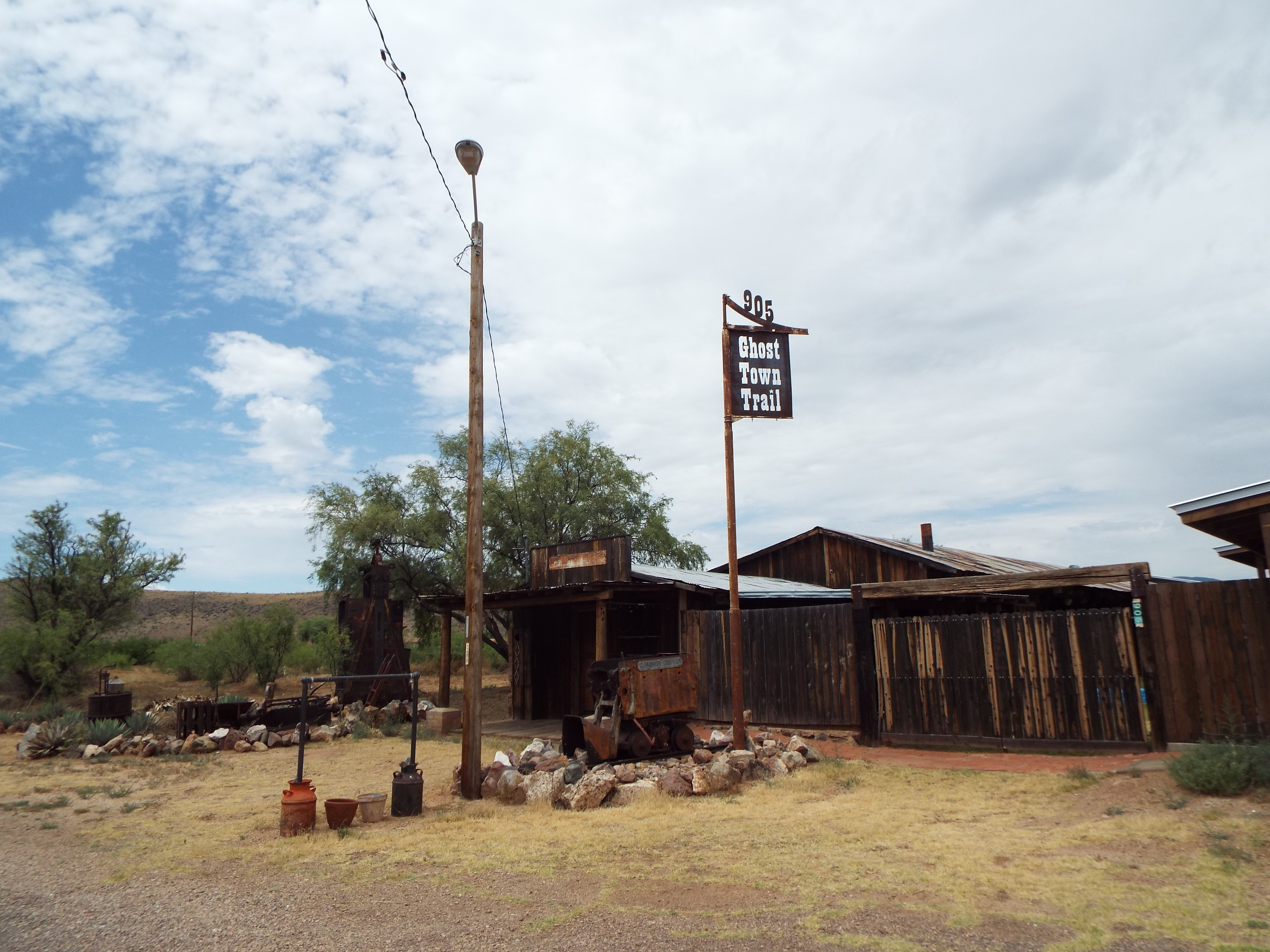
Pearce, Arizona

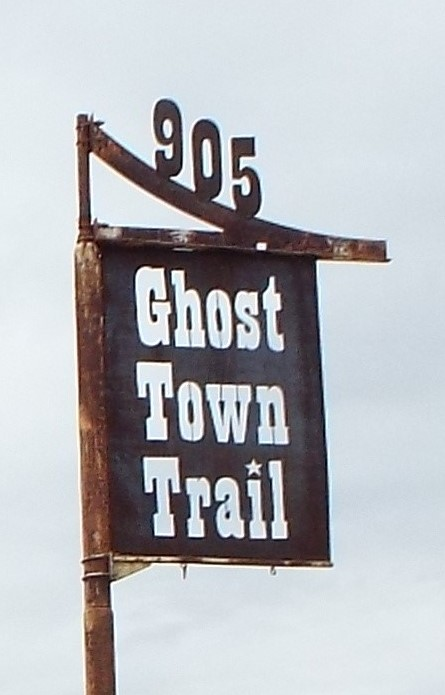
Pearce Ghost Town Trail

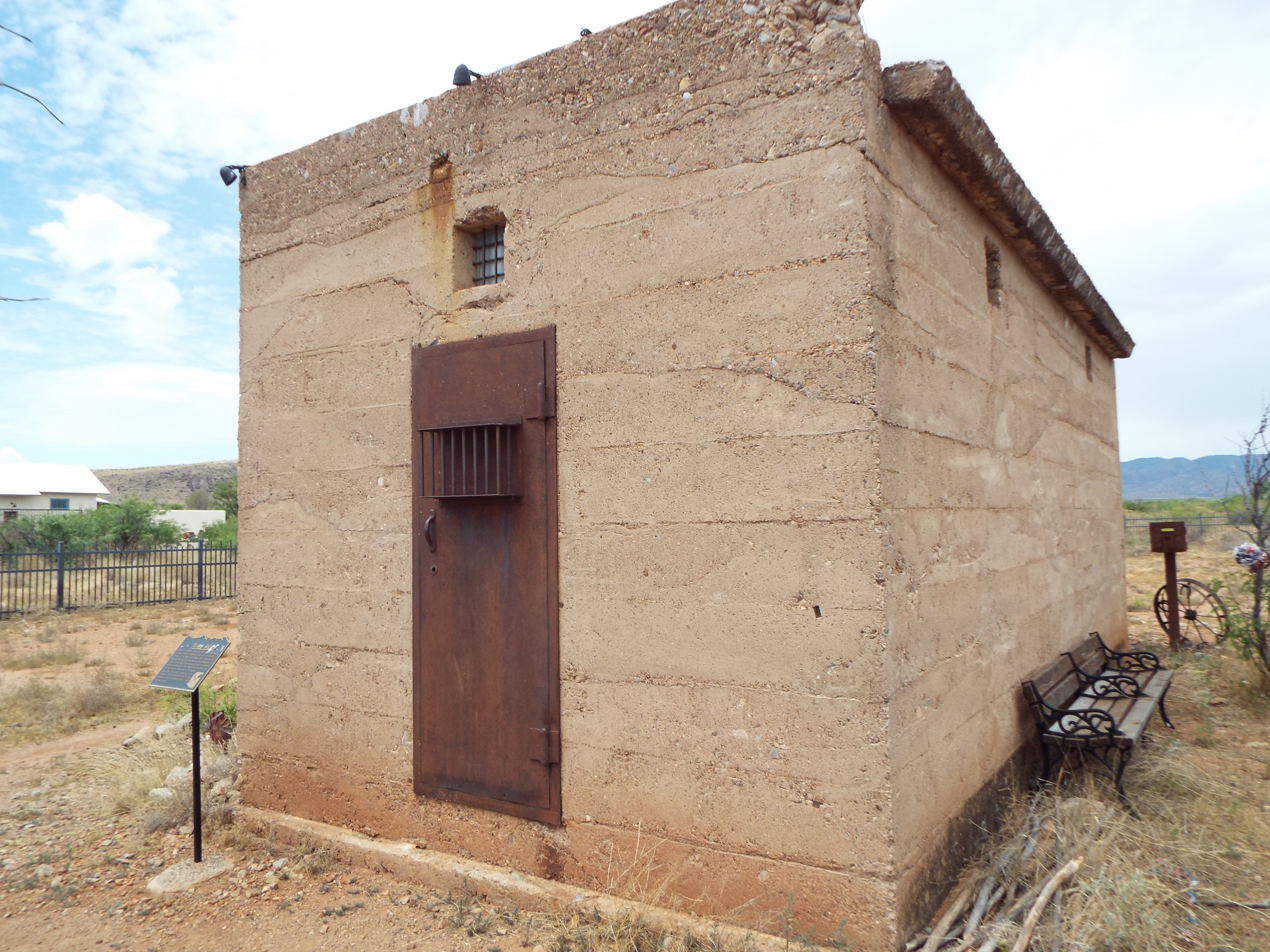
Sheriff's Office

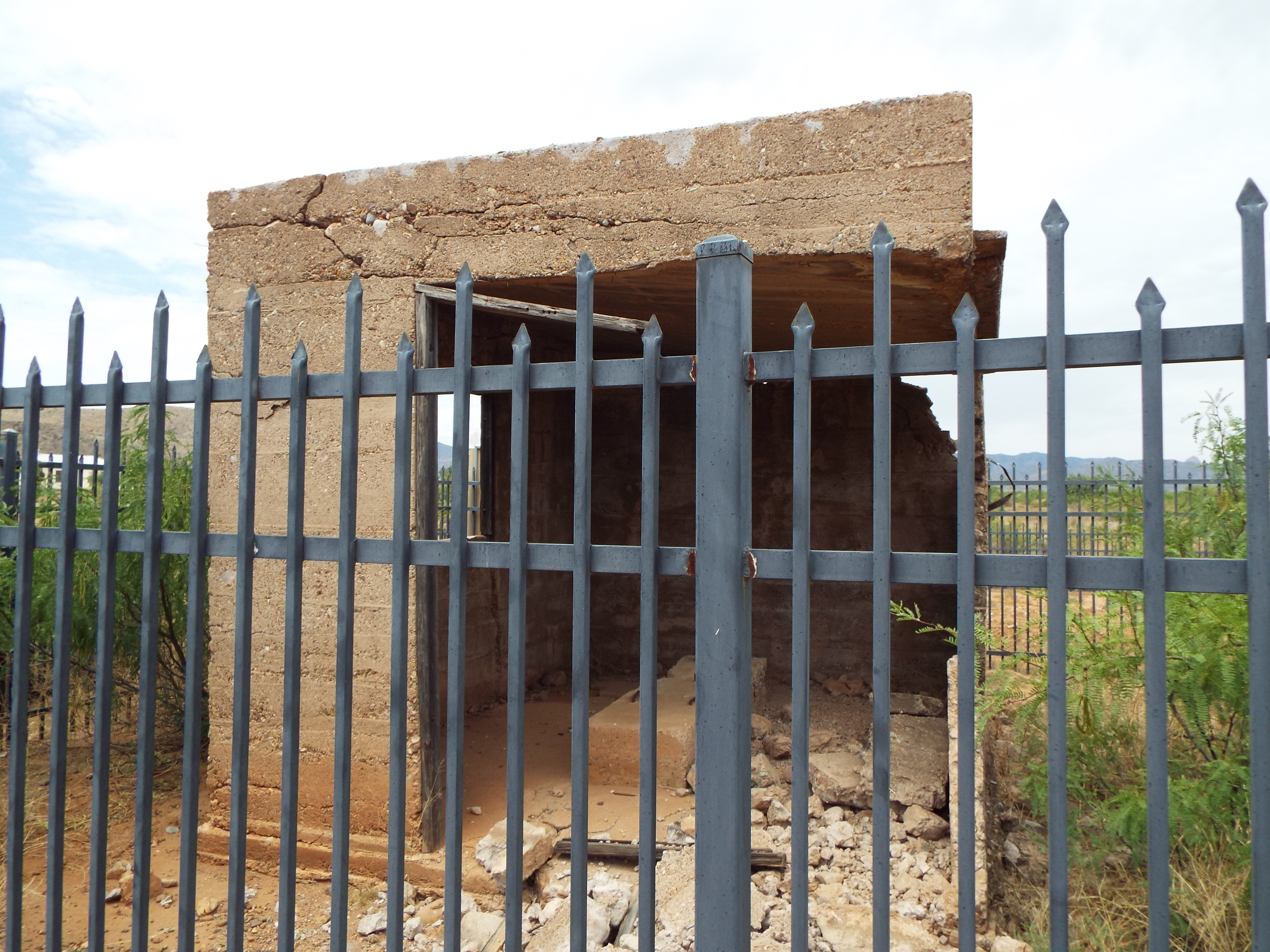
Prisoners' cell

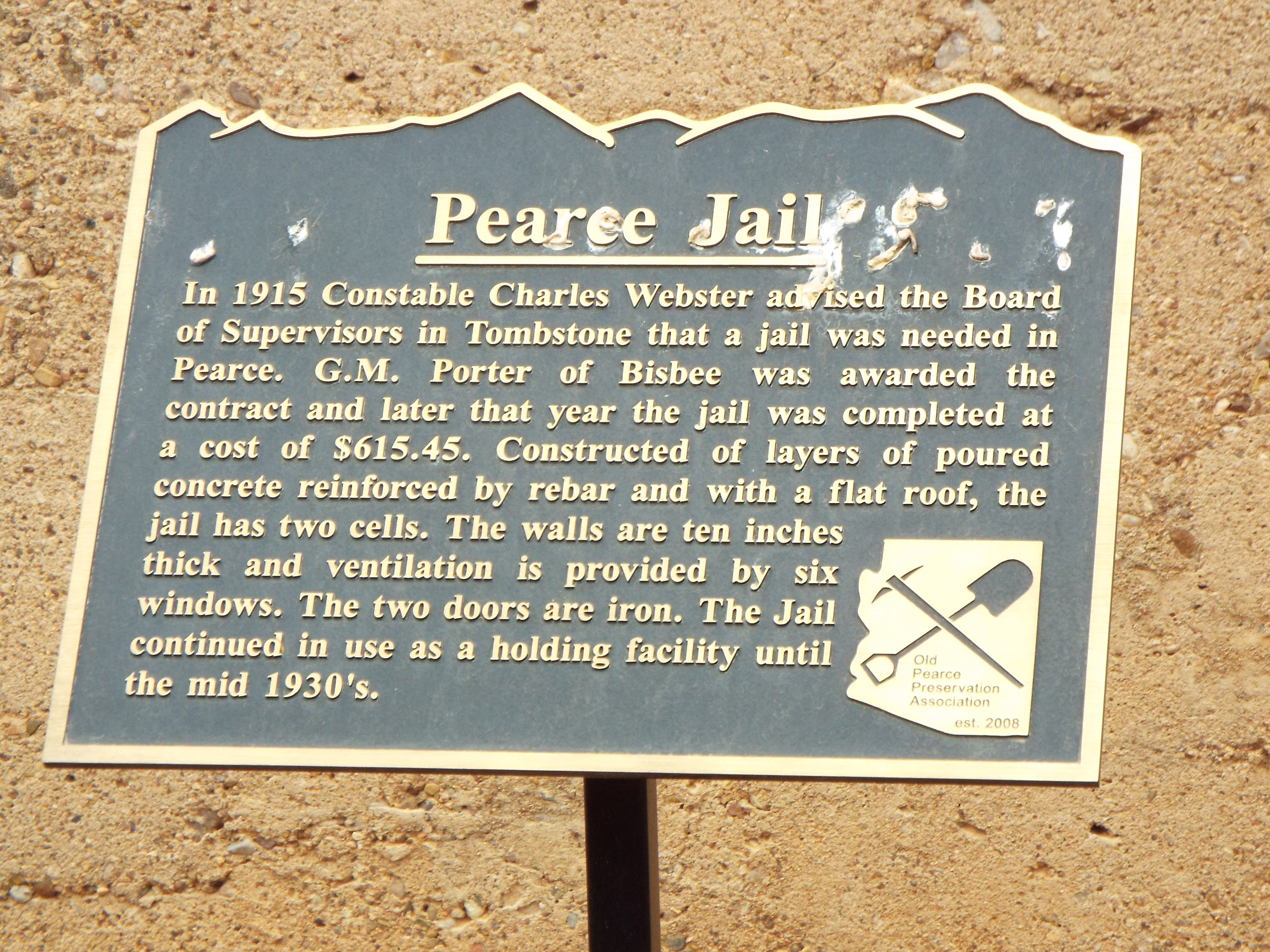
Pearce Jail marker

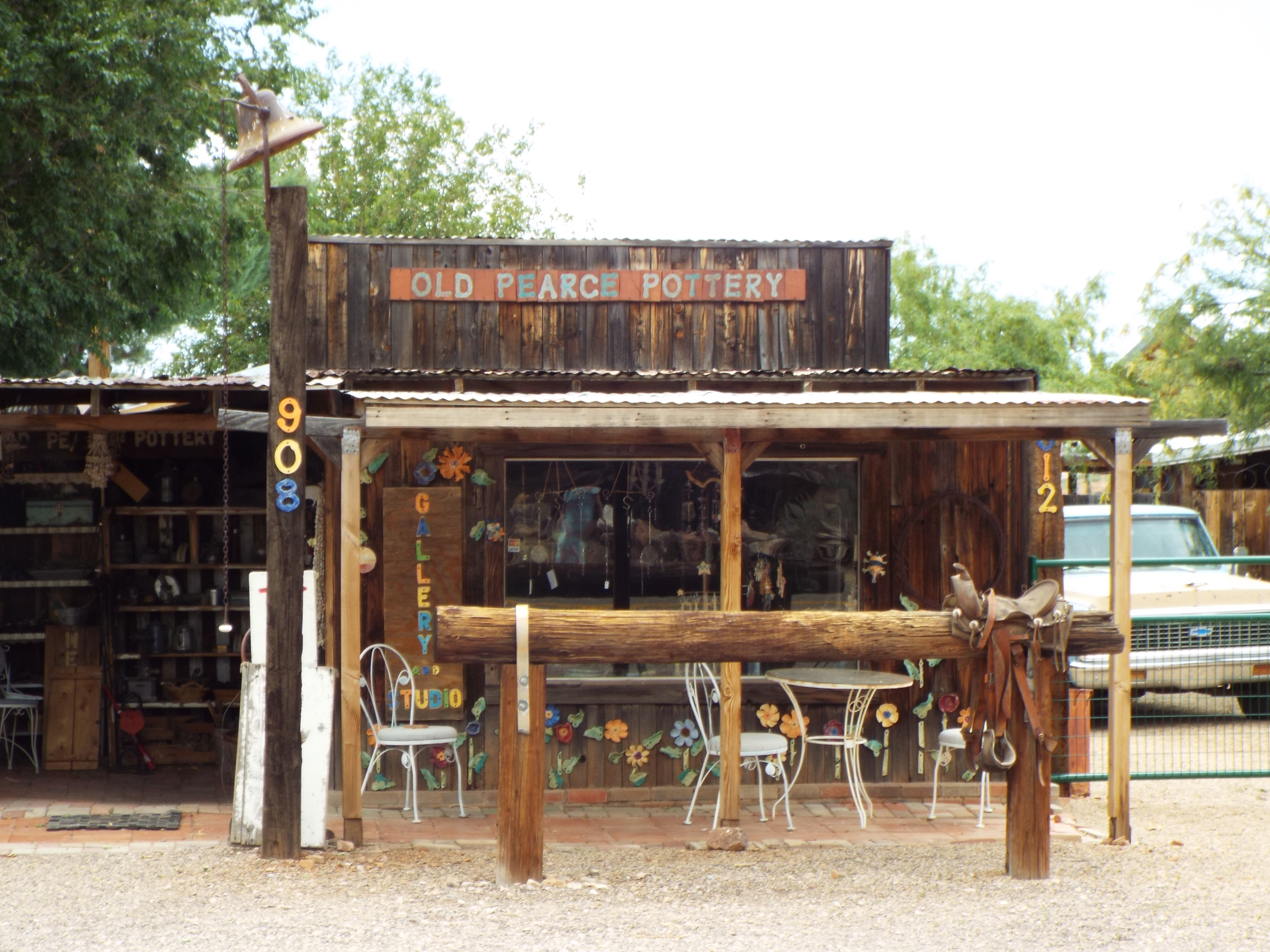
Old Pearce Pottery Store

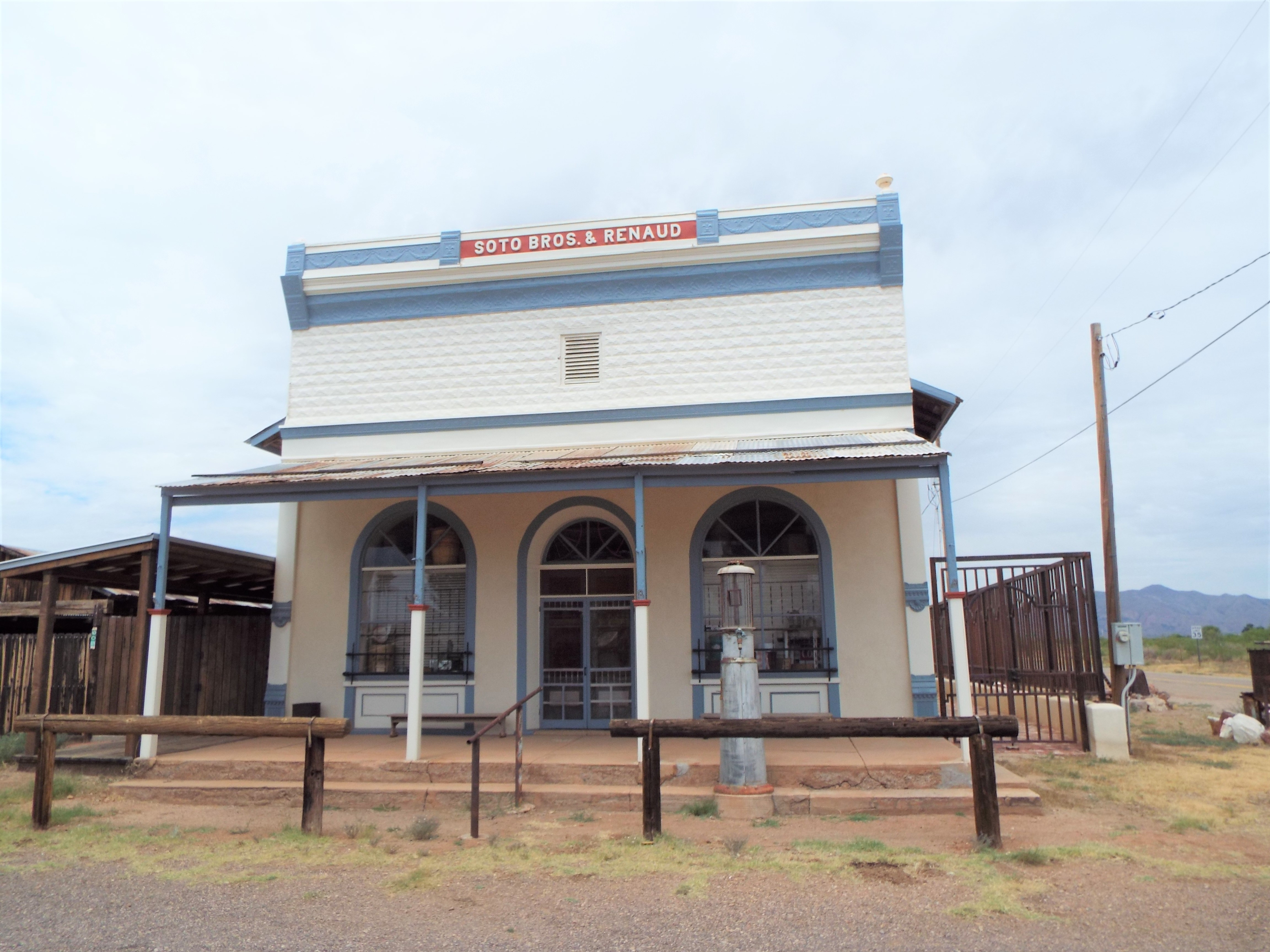
Soto Bros. and Renaud Store a.k.a. the Pearce General Store

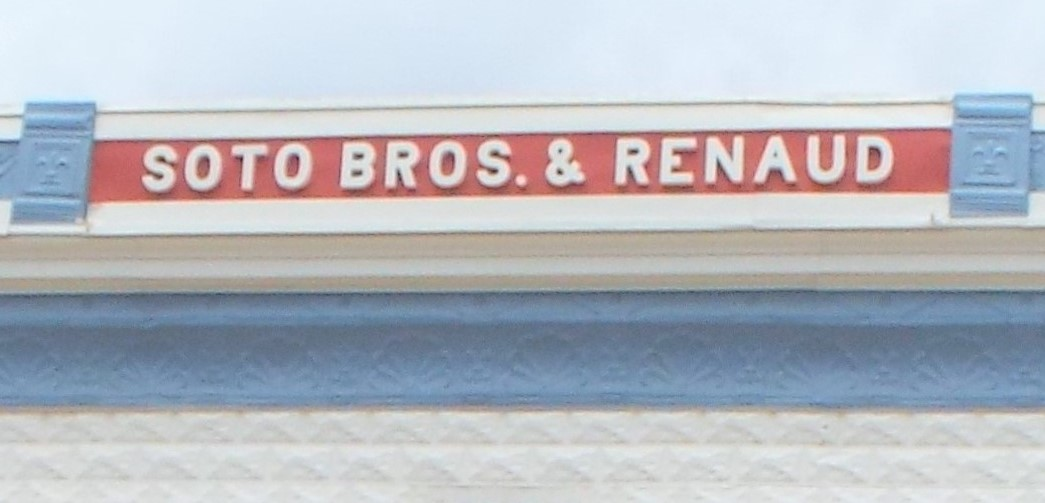
Soto Bros. and Renaud sign

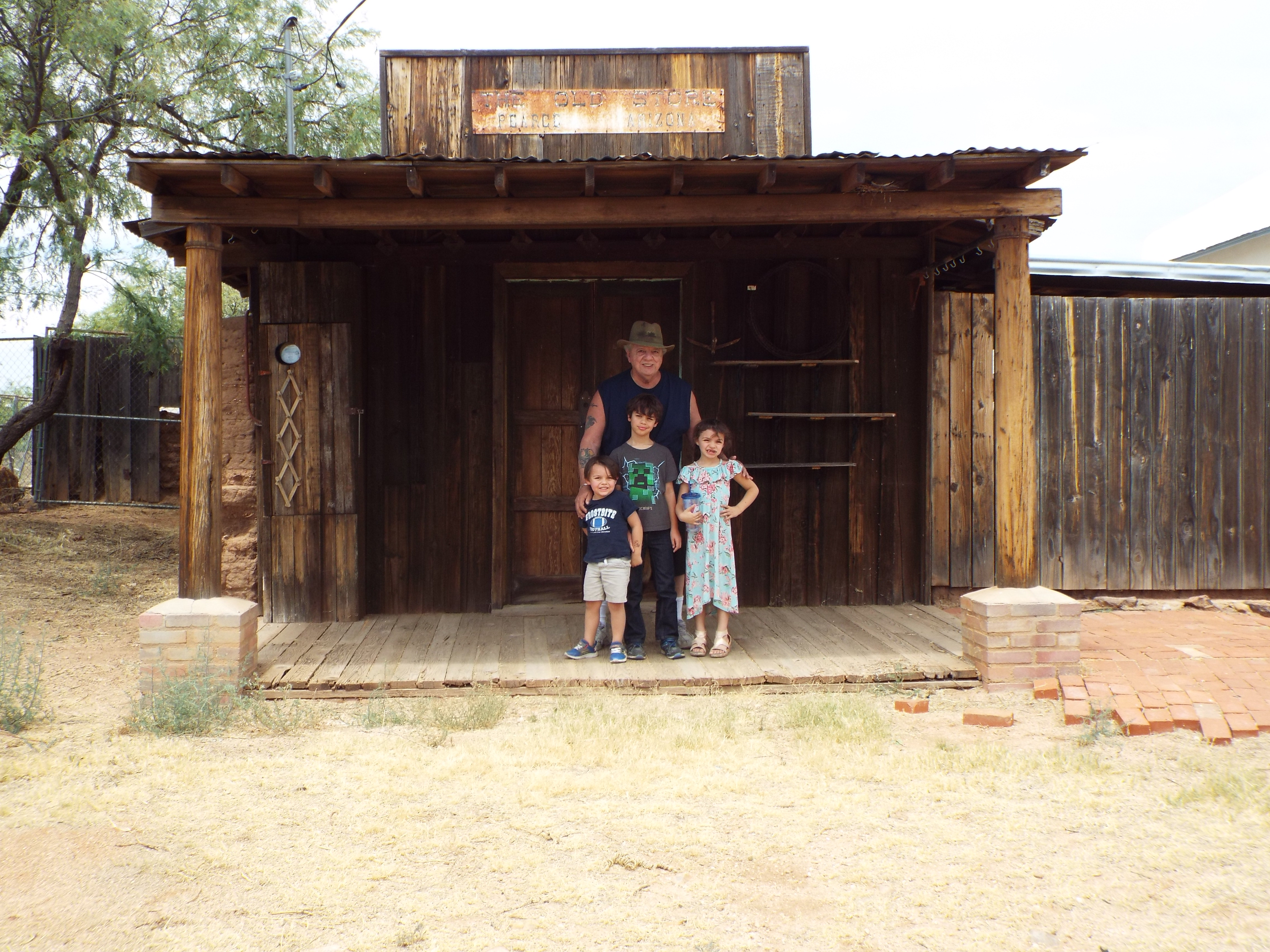
Old General Store

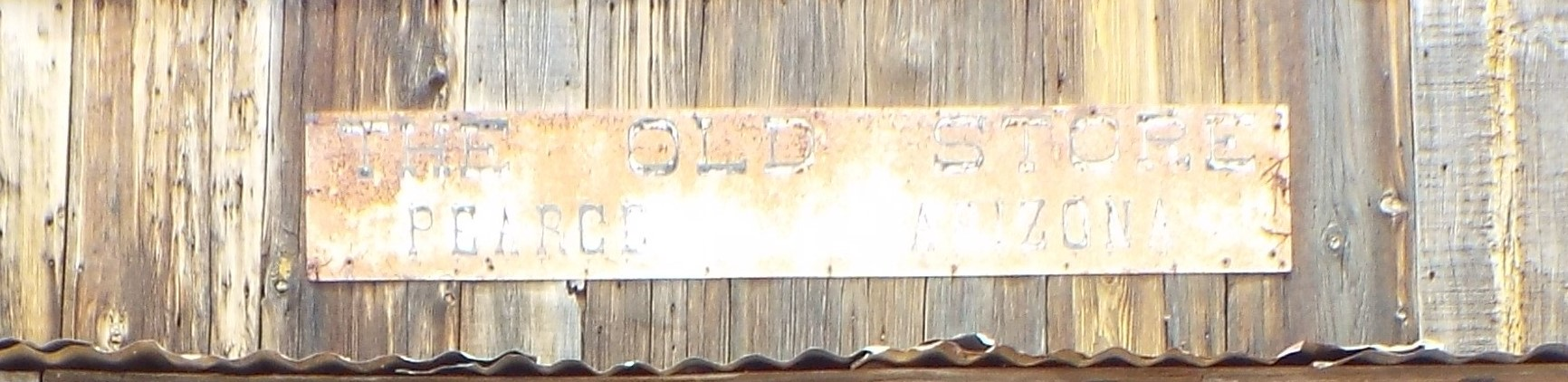
Old General Store sign

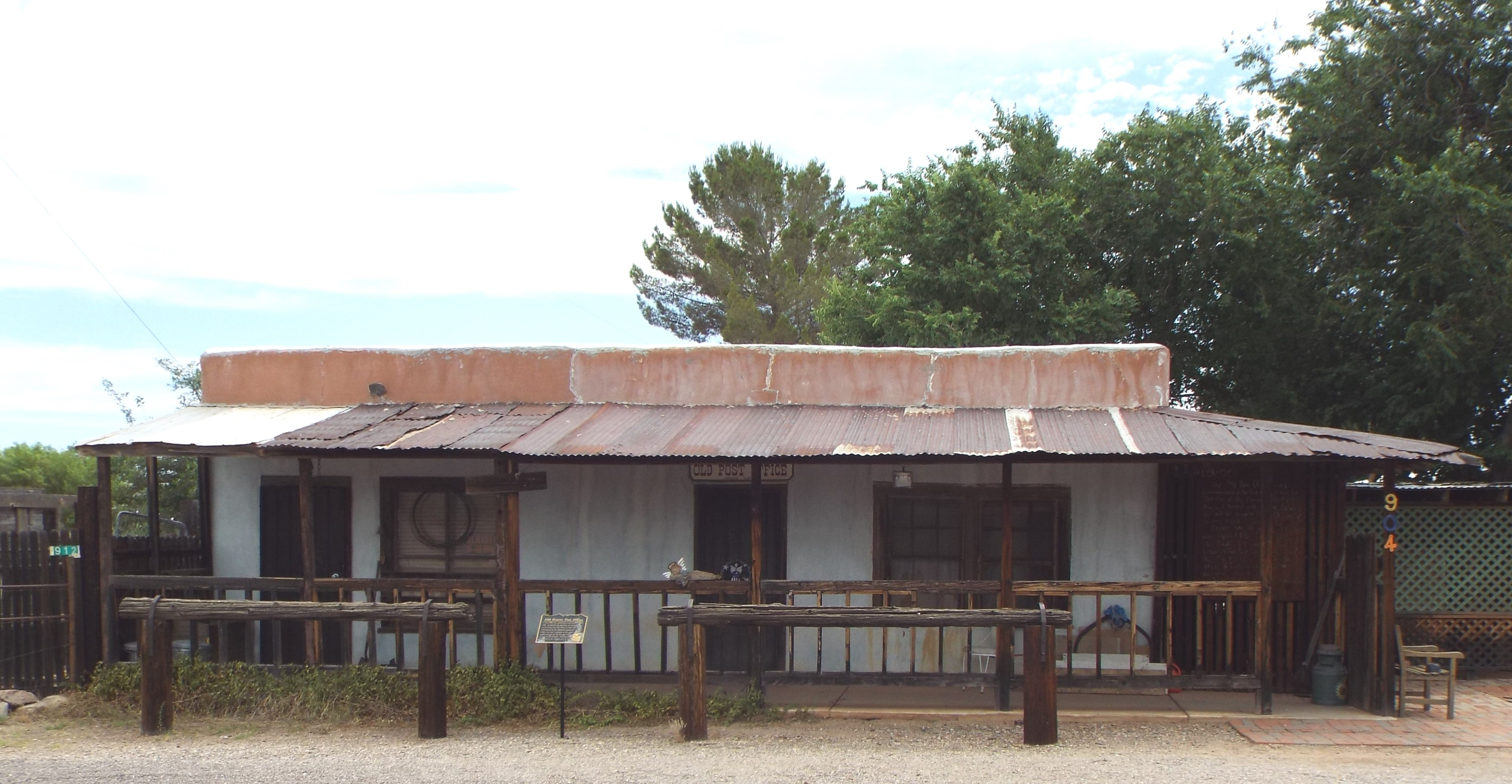
The US Post Office

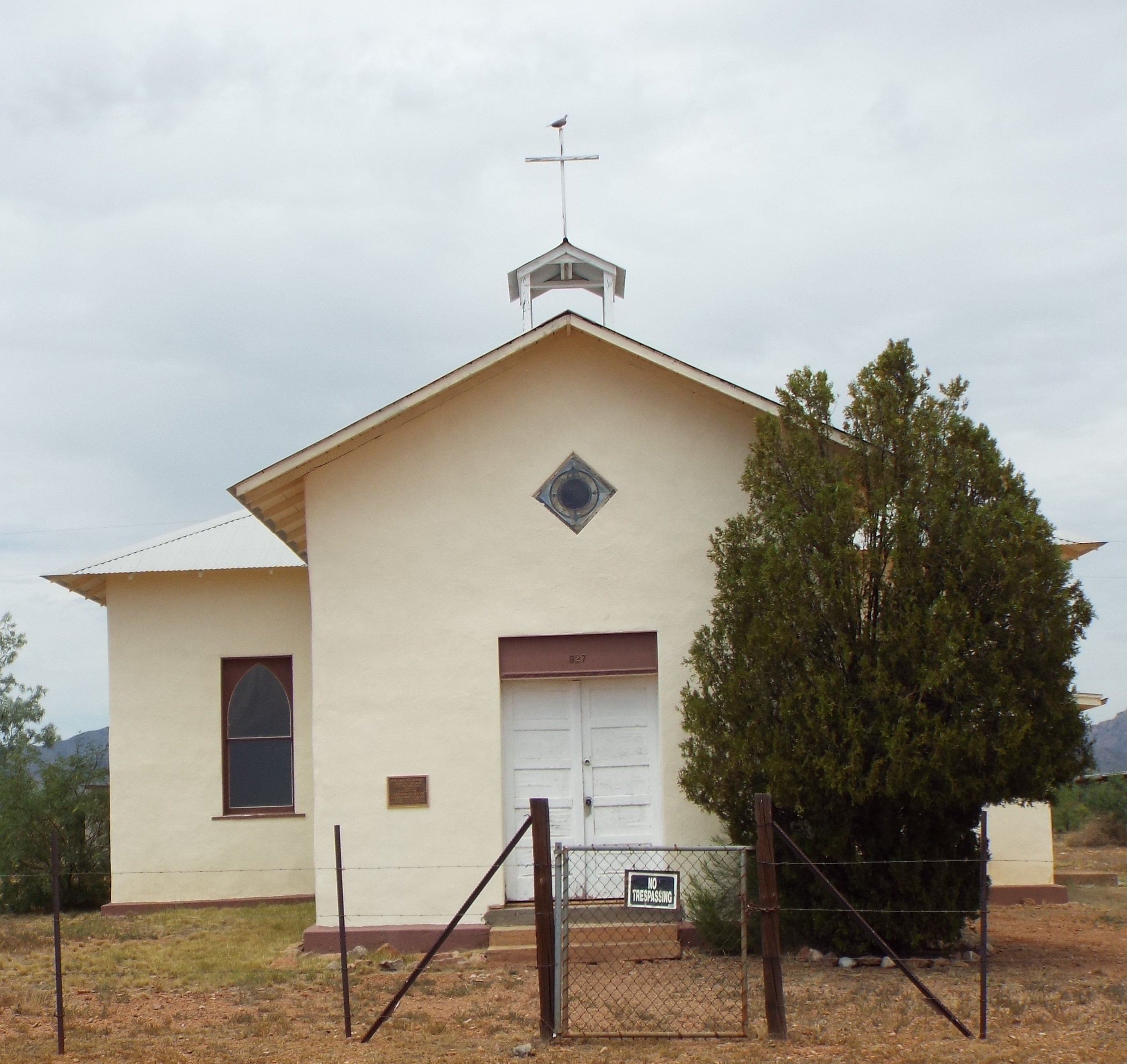
Our Lady of Victory Catholic Church

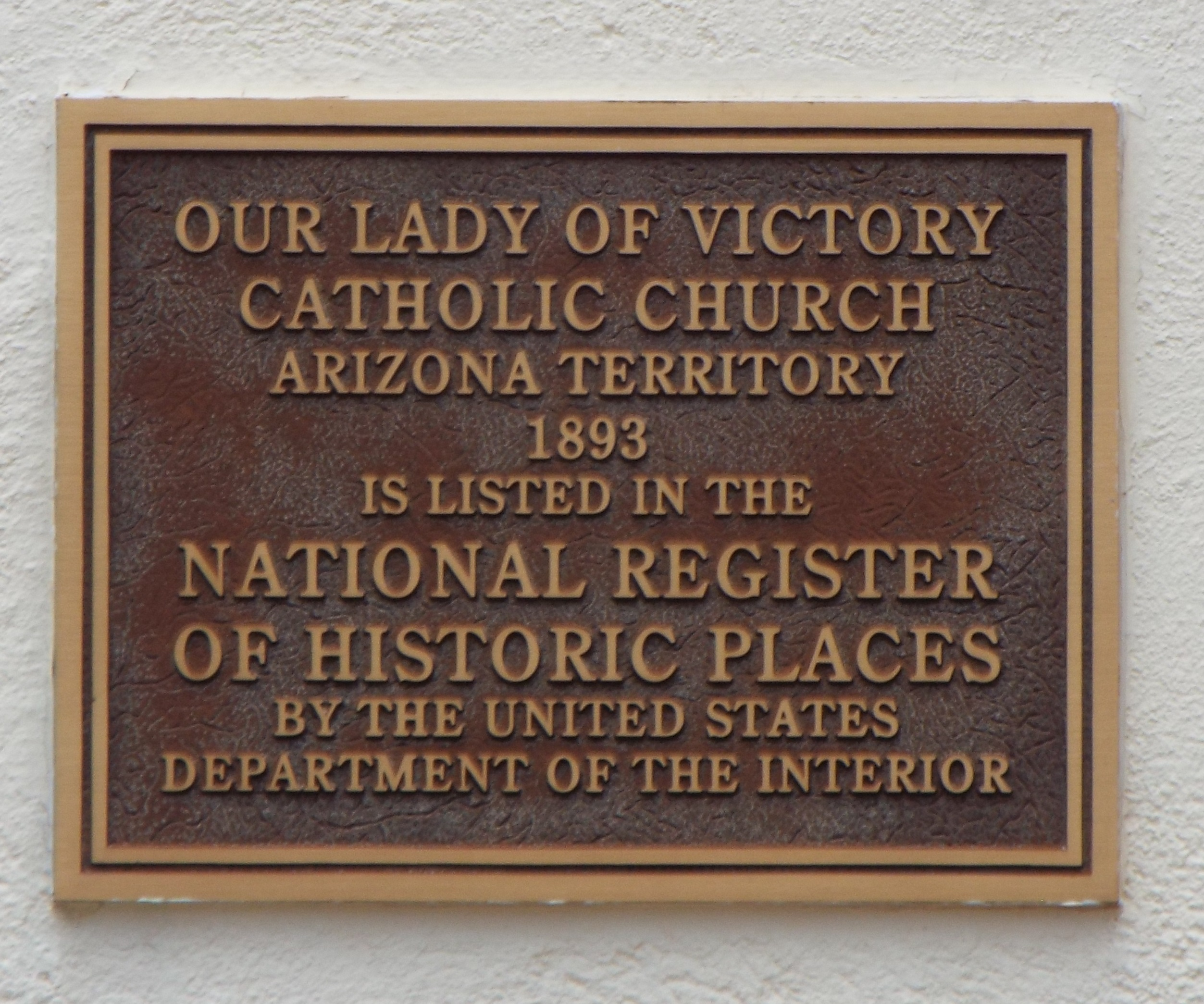
Our Lady of Victory Catholic Church marker

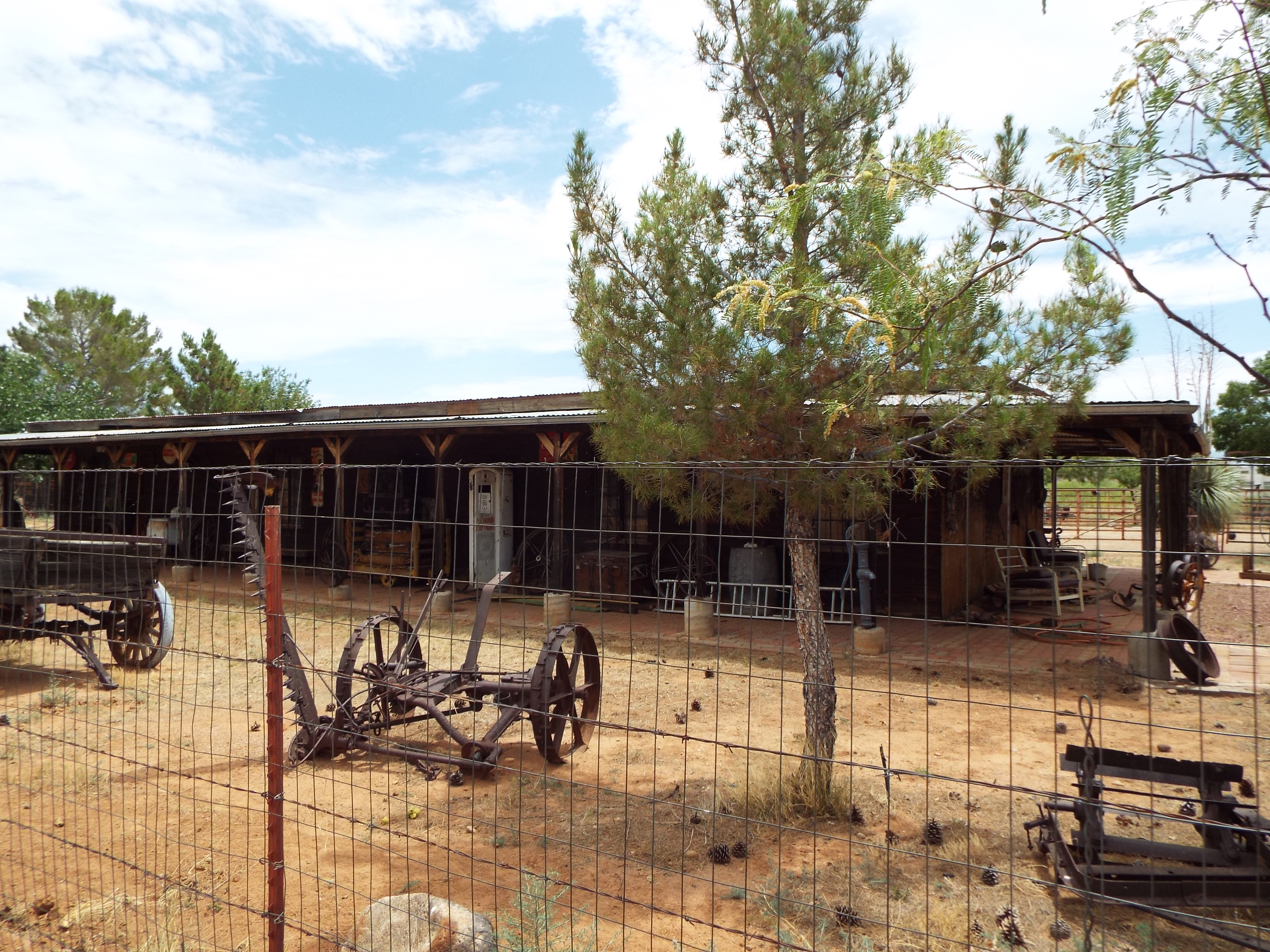
Ranch house in Pearce

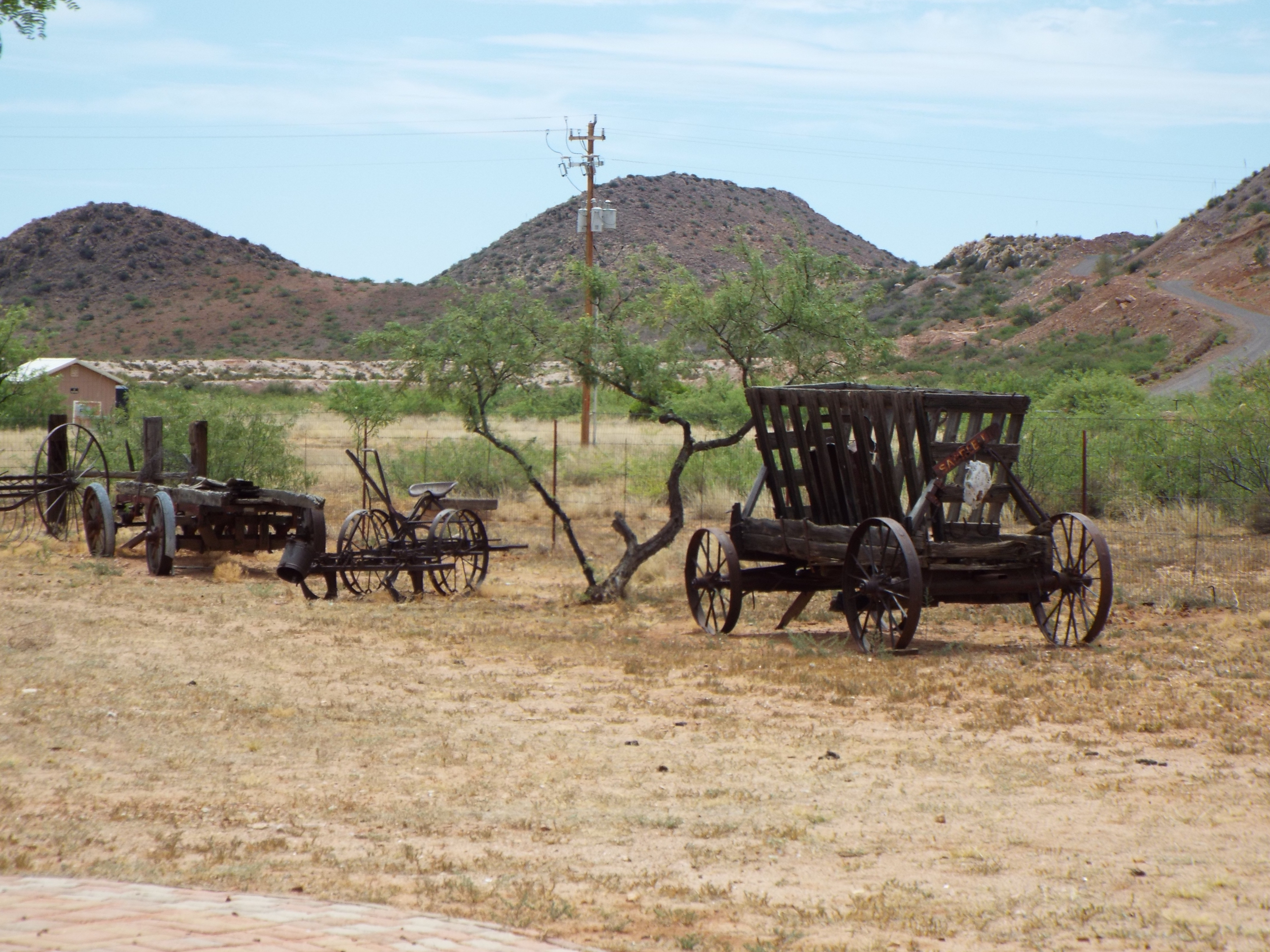
Ranch and farming equipment

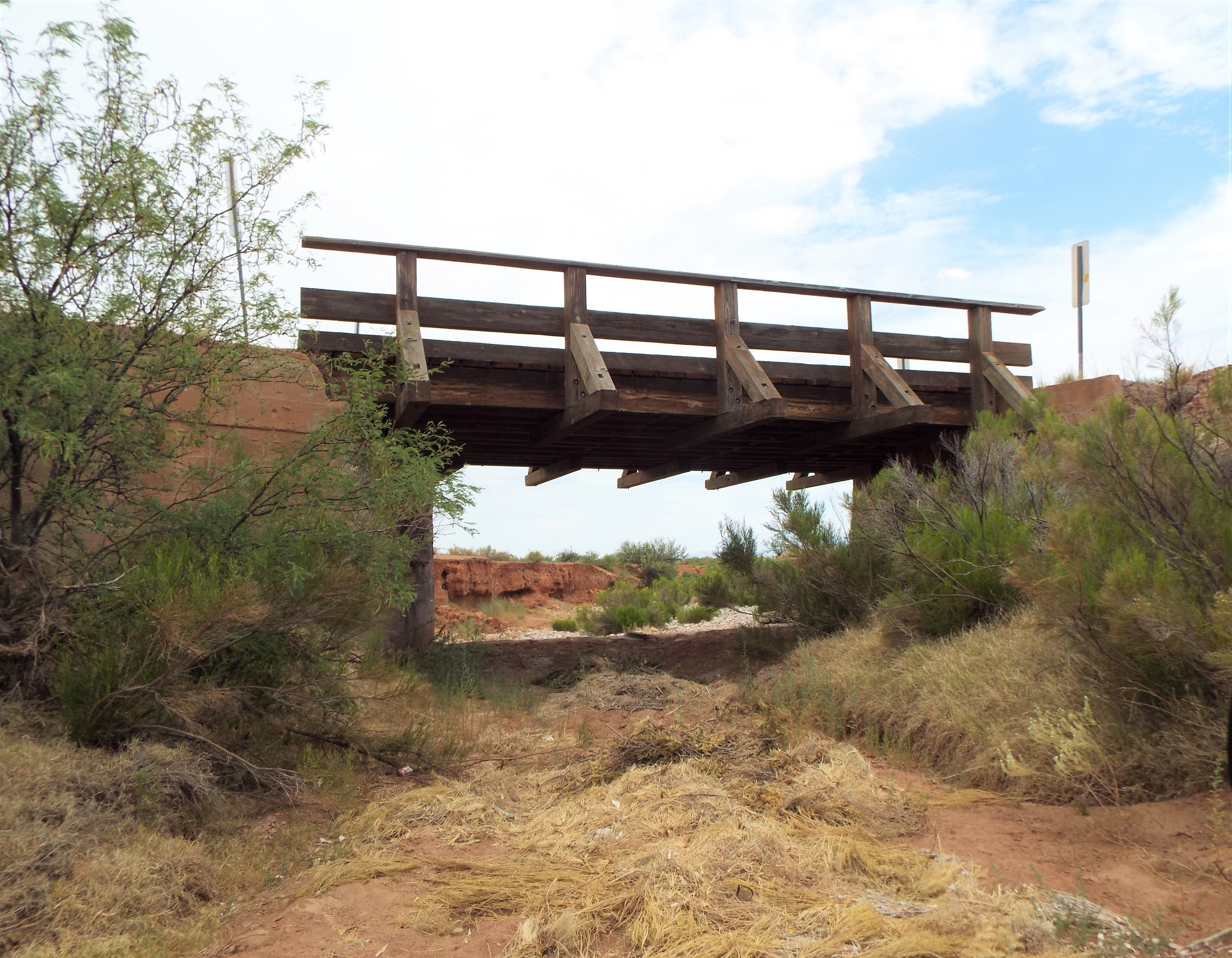
Old Wooden bridge

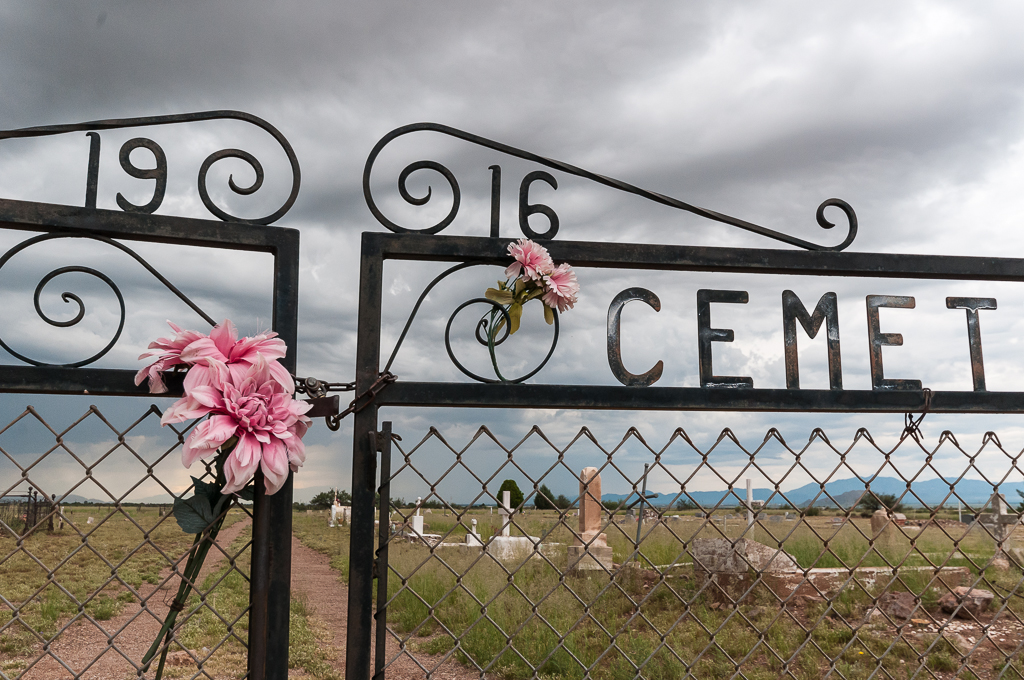
Pearce Cemetery
Johnny Ringo's grave

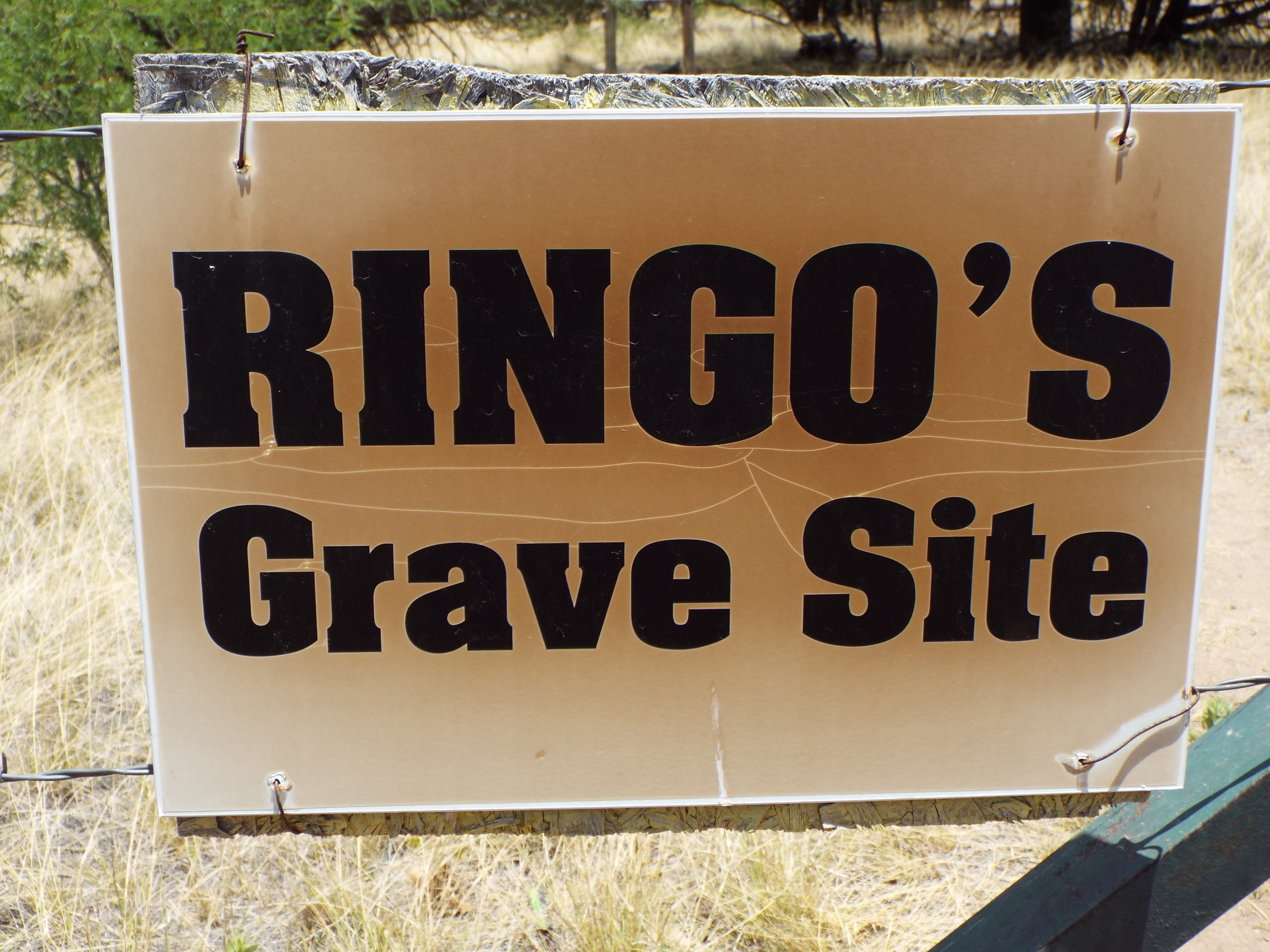
Johnny Ringo grave site sign

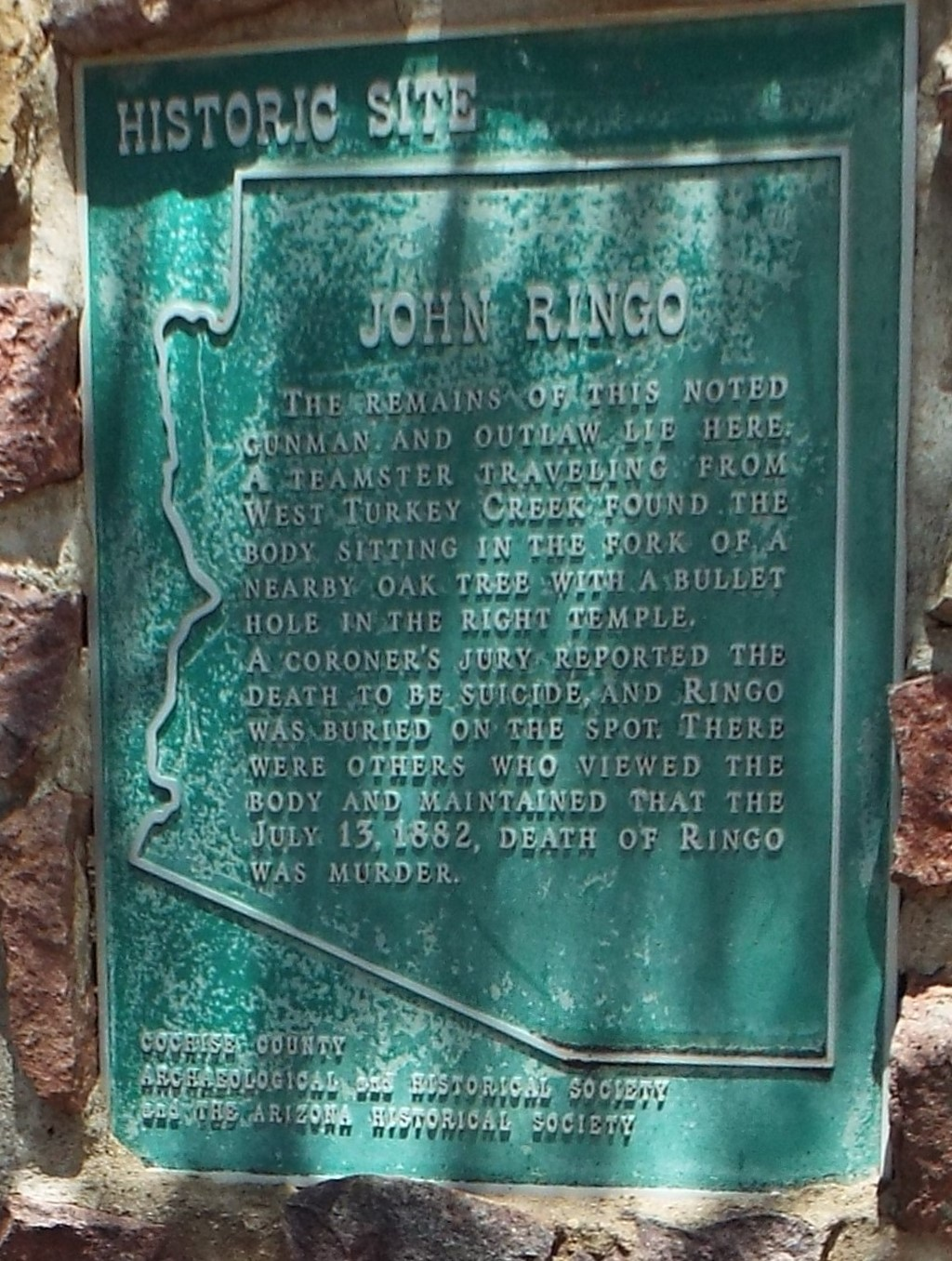
Johnny Ringo grave historic marker

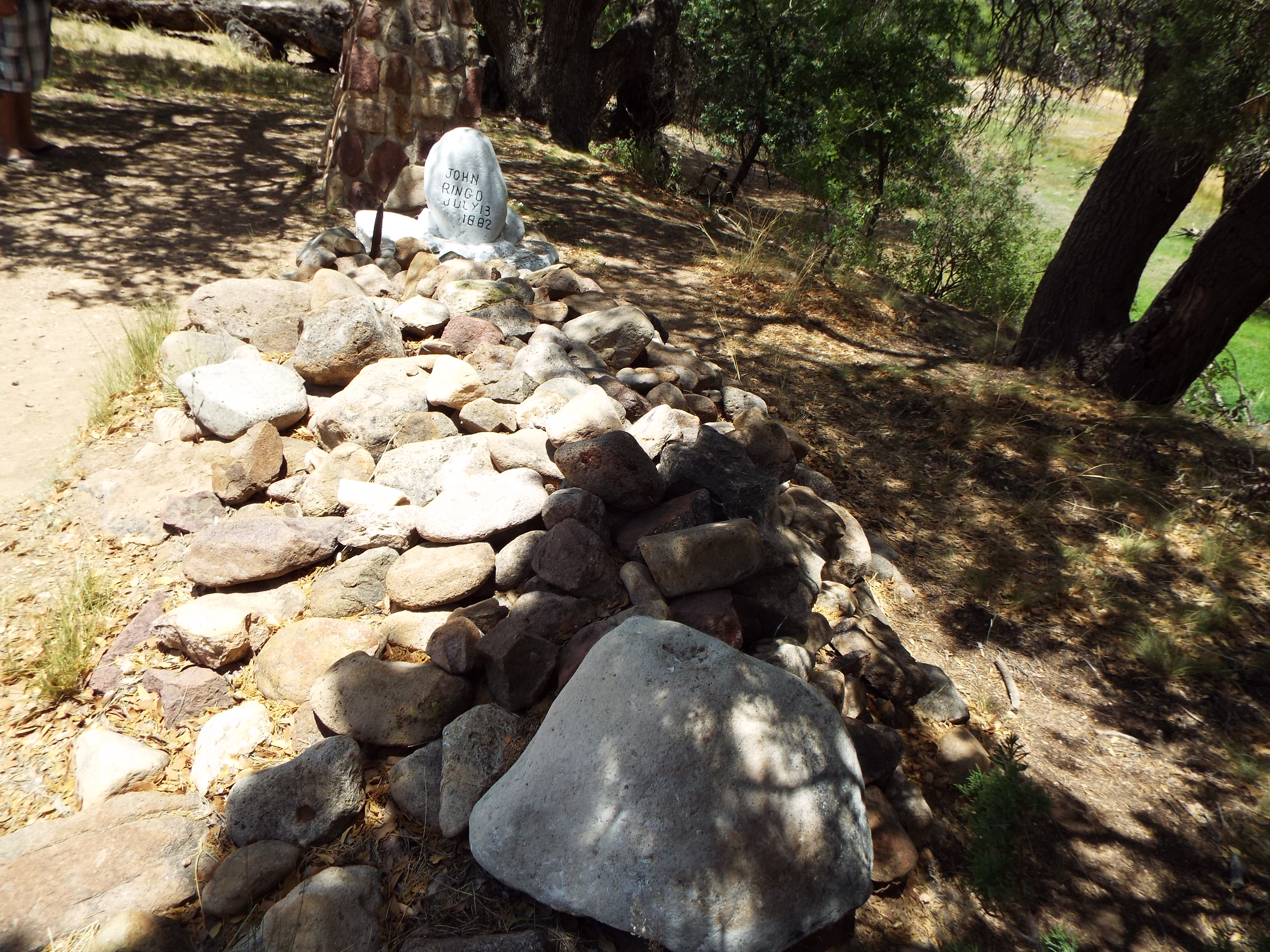
Grave of Johnny Ringo

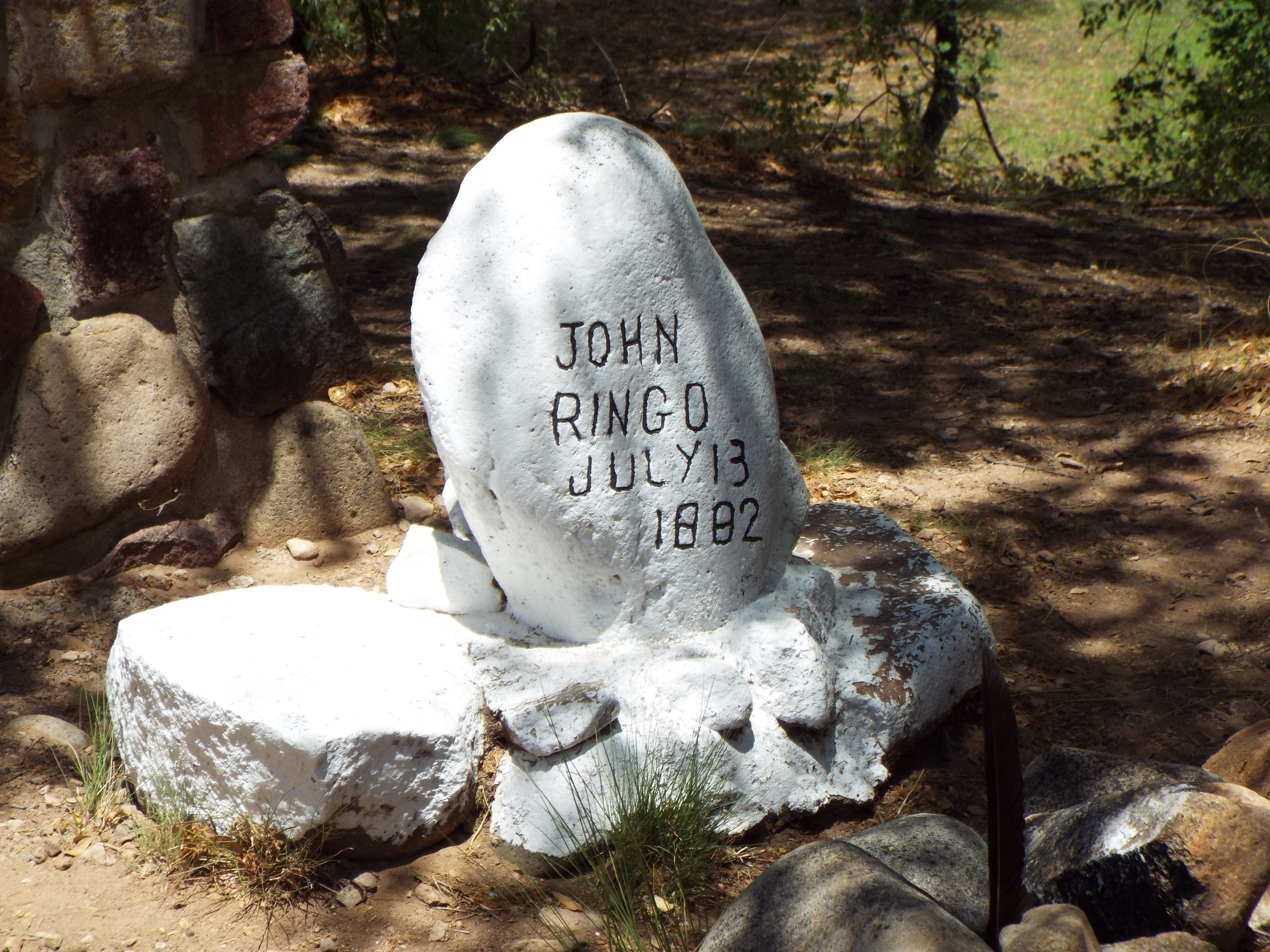
Tombstone on the grave of Johnny Ringo

== See also ==
- National Register of Historic Places listings in Cochise County, Arizona
