= Pearce General Store =

- U.S. National Register of Historic Places
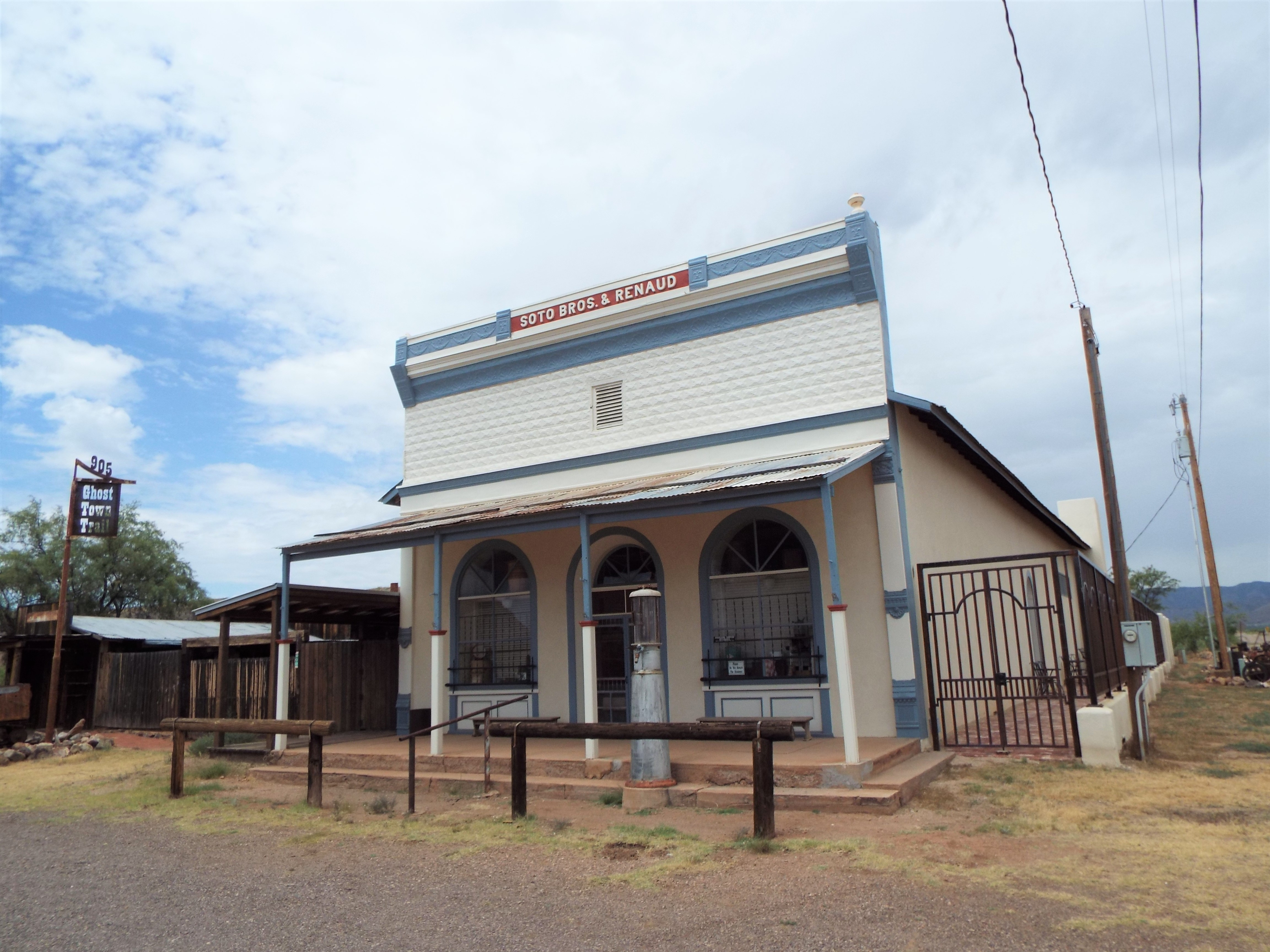
- The store in June 2019

- Location within Arizona Location within the United States
- Location: Southwest corner of Ghost Town Trail & Pearce Road, Pearce, Arizona
- Coordinates: 31°54′16″N 109°49′16″W
- NRHP reference No.: 78000541
- Added to NRHP: November 16, 1978

Pearce General Store is an historic building in Pearce, Arizona. It was added to the National Register of Historic Places in 1978.

== History ==
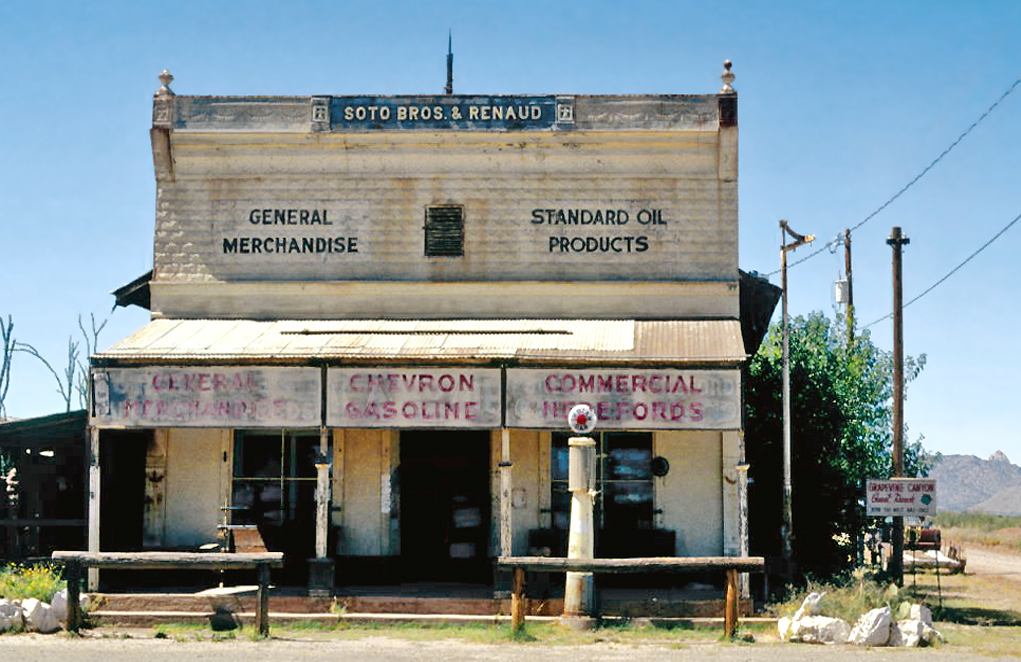
The store in 1989

The store was built in 1893. The store was built by the Soto Brothers, originally a lumber structure, but within two months it was replaced with the current adobe structure. During the town's heyday in the late 1890s, it was the most important building in the mining boomtown, serving as the mercantile and banking center, as well as the post office. While the town faded in the 1900s, the nearby mine which was the main employer in the area, declined, and by the end of World War I, the mine was only worked sporadically through World War II. Even has the town diminished, the store continued to serve local ranchers and tourists. Albert Roth purchased the store in 1936, who sold it to Irving Cornish in 1939. In 1942 Raymond Dooley, president of Lincoln College in Illinois, who retained it until 1968 when it was purchased by Mr. and Mrs. John Thurman of Chicago. All of the owners insisted on retaining the 1890s fixtures and appearance of the store. When it was entered on the NHRP, it had been in continuous operation as a general store since its inception in 1893. From 1988 through 1990, the building was used as a museum of western memorabilia, until it closed in November 1990, and its contents sold at auction.

== Appearance ==
The building is on the southwest corner of Ghost Town Trail and Pearce Road, facing east. The adjoining lumber and wagon yards are south of the store. It is a rectangular building measuring 180 feet by 45 feet, with a gabled roof, and a boomtown facade on the front of the building. There is a shed roof porch running the width of the building, with a double entry door, flanked by large arched windows and pressed metal pilasters. Windows on the sides of the building are also arched, but not as large. There is a 20 square foot basement beneath the store, reached by a trap door. The ceiling is 14 feet high, and covered with embossed metal. When it was entered into the NHRP, ten-foot shelves lined the side walls, with rolling ladders. Original fixtures included a pot-bellied stove, safe, roll-top desk, 5-drawer cash register, glass showcases, and other mercantile paraphernalia.
