= Pearce, Arizona =

Ghost town in Cochise County, Arizona

- Ghost town
- Location of Pearce in Arizona
- Coordinates: 31°54′18″N 109°49′14″W
- Country: United States
- State: Arizona
- County: Cochise
- Settled: 1894
- Zip code: 85625

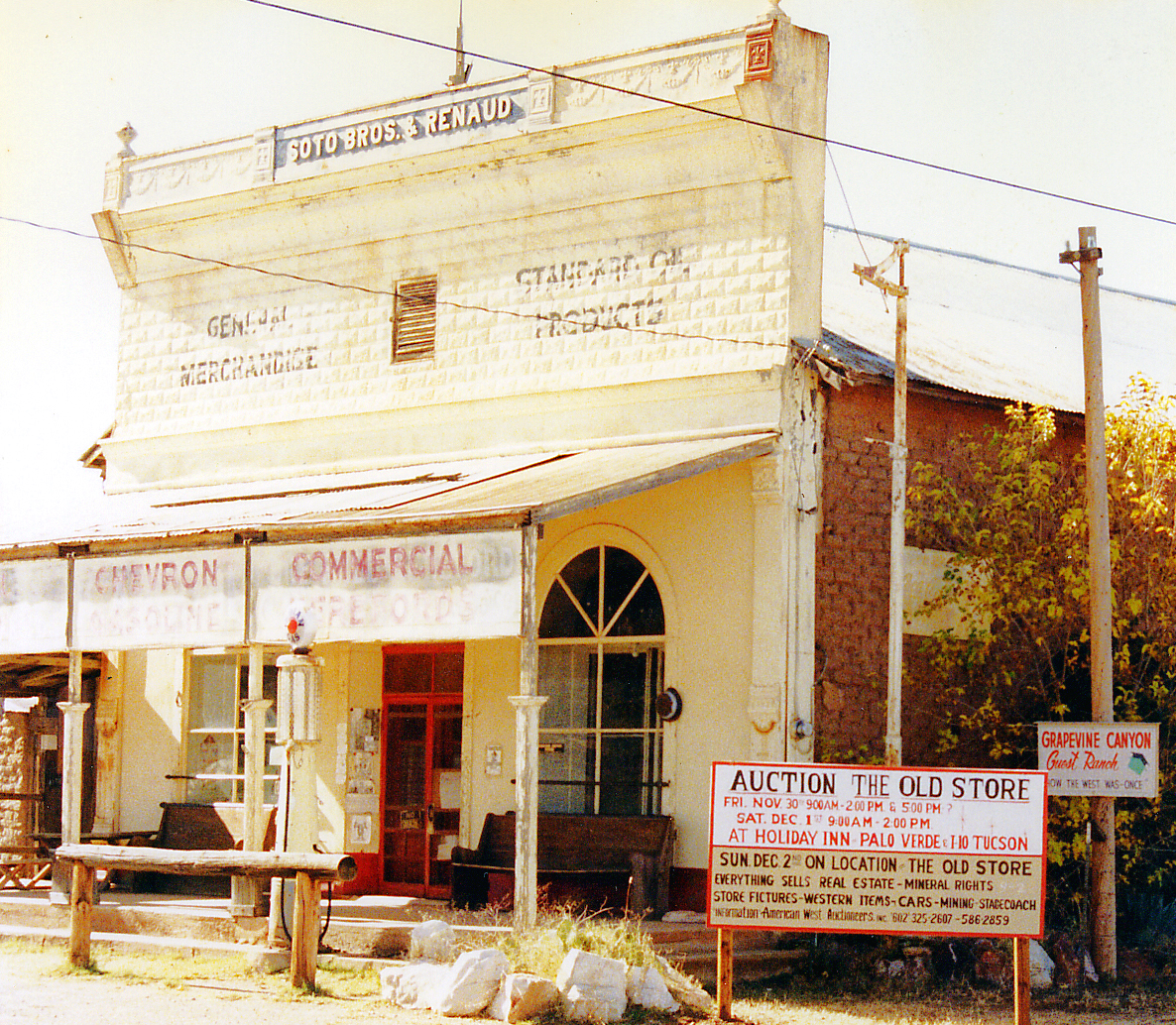
The Old Pearce General Store, 1990.

Pearce, Arizona, and Sunsites, Arizona, are adjacent unincorporated communities in the Sulphur Springs Valley of Cochise County, Arizona, United States. The two communities are often referred to as Pearce–Sunsites, Pearce/Sunsites, or Pearce Sunsites.

Pearce is located between the Cochise Stronghold, Chiricahua National Monument, and the winter Sandhill Crane refuge of Whitewater Draw making it popular for birders, history buffs, hikers, and climbers alike. At 4,400 feet of elevation, the area is also known for its milder summers which make it ideal for quality grapes and vineyards (recognized as an American Viticultural Area).

Pearce is best known as a historic ghost town. Sunsites, founded in 1961, adjoins Pearce, and the Sunizona and Richland developments are nearby. All of these communities share the Pearce, Arizona post office and ZIP code, 85625. The 85625 ZIP Code Tabulation Area, which includes the four communities named plus a large surrounding rural area, had a population of 2104 at the 2000 census and 1983 in the 2010 census. The Pearce–Sunsites economy is based on retirees and tourism.

Fittsburg was the site of the Commonwealth Mine and is located about one mile east of Pearce.

== History ==
Pearce is a mining ghost town named for Cornishman James Pearce, miner and cattleman, who discovered gold nearby at what became the Commonwealth Mine in 1894. The Pearce Post Office was established on March 6, 1896. The railroad station opened in 1903. By 1919, Pearce had a population of 1,500. The town declined in the 1930s and became almost a ghost town in the late 1940s when the mine closed for the last time.

The Commonwealth Mine became one of Arizona's major silver producers. Over 1,000,000 tons of ore were produced from 1895 to 1942. There are about 20 miles of underground workings. The mine produced about $8 million worth of silver and $2.5 million in gold at a time when silver was priced around 50 cents an ounce, and gold was $20 an ounce.

Sunsites was established in the 1950s and 1960s by New York lawyer Joseph Timan and his Horizon Land Company. Horizon sold undeveloped land to buyers. The Federal Trade Commission eventually ordered Horizon to pay money to the buyers due to false and misleading ads.

== Historic sites ==
Pearce is the home of two properties on the National Register of Historic Places. The Pearce General Store opened in 1896. The store remained open as a tourist attraction until 1990. Our Lady of Victory Catholic Church was added to the National Register of Historic Places in 2004. There are a number of other historic structures still extant in and around Pearce, some still in use, others in ruins.

== Climate ==
Pearce has a cold semi-arid climate (Köppen: BSk) with cool winters and hot summers.

Climate data for Pearce–Sunsites, Arizona (1991–2020 normals, extremes 1913–1918, 1950–1980, 1988–present)
Month	Jan	Feb	Mar	Apr	May	Jun	Jul	Aug	Sep	Oct	Nov	Dec	Year
Record high °F (°C)	82 (28)	87 (31)	90 (32)	97 (36)	103 (39)	109 (43)	108 (42)	104 (40)	102 (39)	98 (37)	89 (32)	79 (26)	109 (43)
Mean daily maximum °F (°C)	60.0 (15.6)	63.7 (17.6)	70.4 (21.3)	77.5 (25.3)	85.8 (29.9)	94.8 (34.9)	92.6 (33.7)	90.7 (32.6)	87.7 (30.9)	80.0 (26.7)	68.8 (20.4)	59.3 (15.2)	77.6 (25.3)
Daily mean °F (°C)	44.6 (7.0)	47.9 (8.8)	53.4 (11.9)	59.6 (15.3)	67.7 (19.8)	77.1 (25.1)	78.9 (26.1)	77.2 (25.1)	72.5 (22.5)	62.9 (17.2)	52.2 (11.2)	44.4 (6.9)	61.5 (16.4)
Mean daily minimum °F (°C)	29.1 (−1.6)	32.1 (0.1)	36.5 (2.5)	41.7 (5.4)	49.5 (9.7)	59.4 (15.2)	65.1 (18.4)	63.6 (17.6)	57.4 (14.1)	45.8 (7.7)	35.5 (1.9)	29.4 (−1.4)	45.4 (7.4)
Record low °F (°C)	4 (−16)	2 (−17)	11 (−12)	22 (−6)	26 (−3)	41 (5)	52 (11)	50 (10)	39 (4)	22 (−6)	12 (−11)	−8 (−22)	−8 (−22)
Average precipitation inches (mm)	0.85 (22)	0.75 (19)	0.55 (14)	0.19 (4.8)	0.23 (5.8)	0.56 (14)	2.58 (66)	2.86 (73)	1.47 (37)	0.68 (17)	0.67 (17)	0.80 (20)	12.19 (310)
Average snowfall inches (cm)	0.7 (1.8)	0.2 (0.51)	0.1 (0.25)	0.0 (0.0)	0.0 (0.0)	0.0 (0.0)	0.0 (0.0)	0.0 (0.0)	0.0 (0.0)	0.0 (0.0)	0.2 (0.51)	0.0 (0.0)	1.2 (3.0)
Average precipitation days (≥ 0.01 inch)	4.2	4.6	3.2	1.6	2.0	2.5	9.4	10.8	5.5	3.2	3.1	4.5	54.6
Average snowy days (≥ 0.1 inch)	0.0	0.0	0.0	0.0	0.0	0.0	0.0	0.0	0.0	0.0	0.1	0.2	0.3
Source: NOAA

== Notable people ==
- Burt Alvord, late 19th-century lawman in Pearce
- Daniel Barringer (geologist), part owner of Commonwealth Mine
- Bill Downing, a notorious late 19th-century outlaw
- Edward Landers Drew, Pinal County deputy sheriff buried in the Pearce Cemetery
- R. A. F. Penrose, Jr., part owner of Commonwealth Mine
- Effie Anderson Smith, Arizona Impressionist painter of landscapes, and wife of mine manager A.Y. Smith
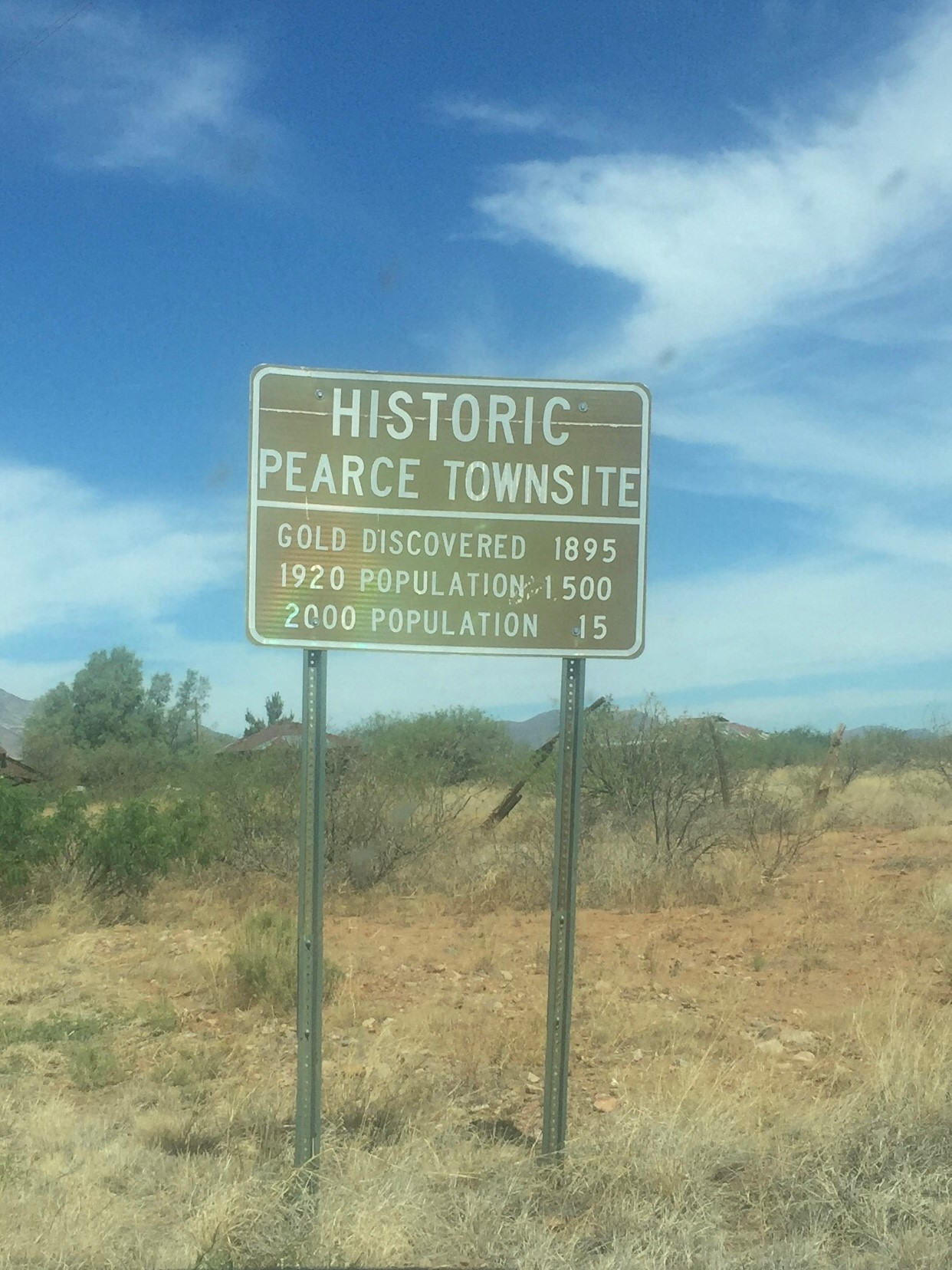
Historic Pearce Townsite Sign

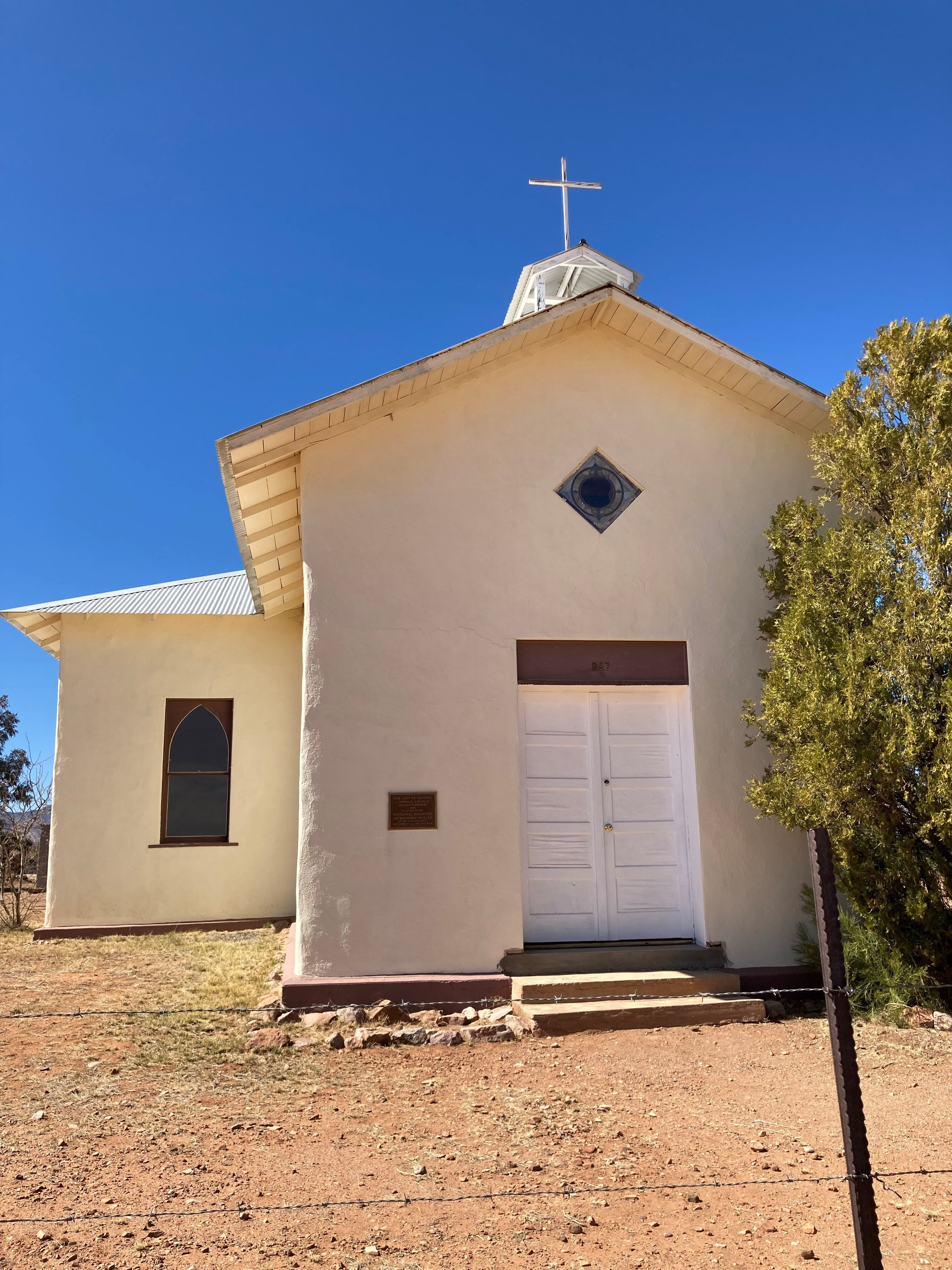
Our Lady of Victory Catholic Church, Pearce, AZ

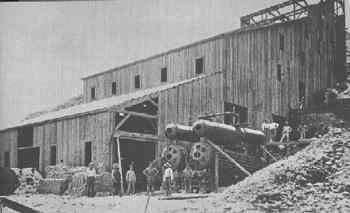
The mill at Fittsburg, c.1900.

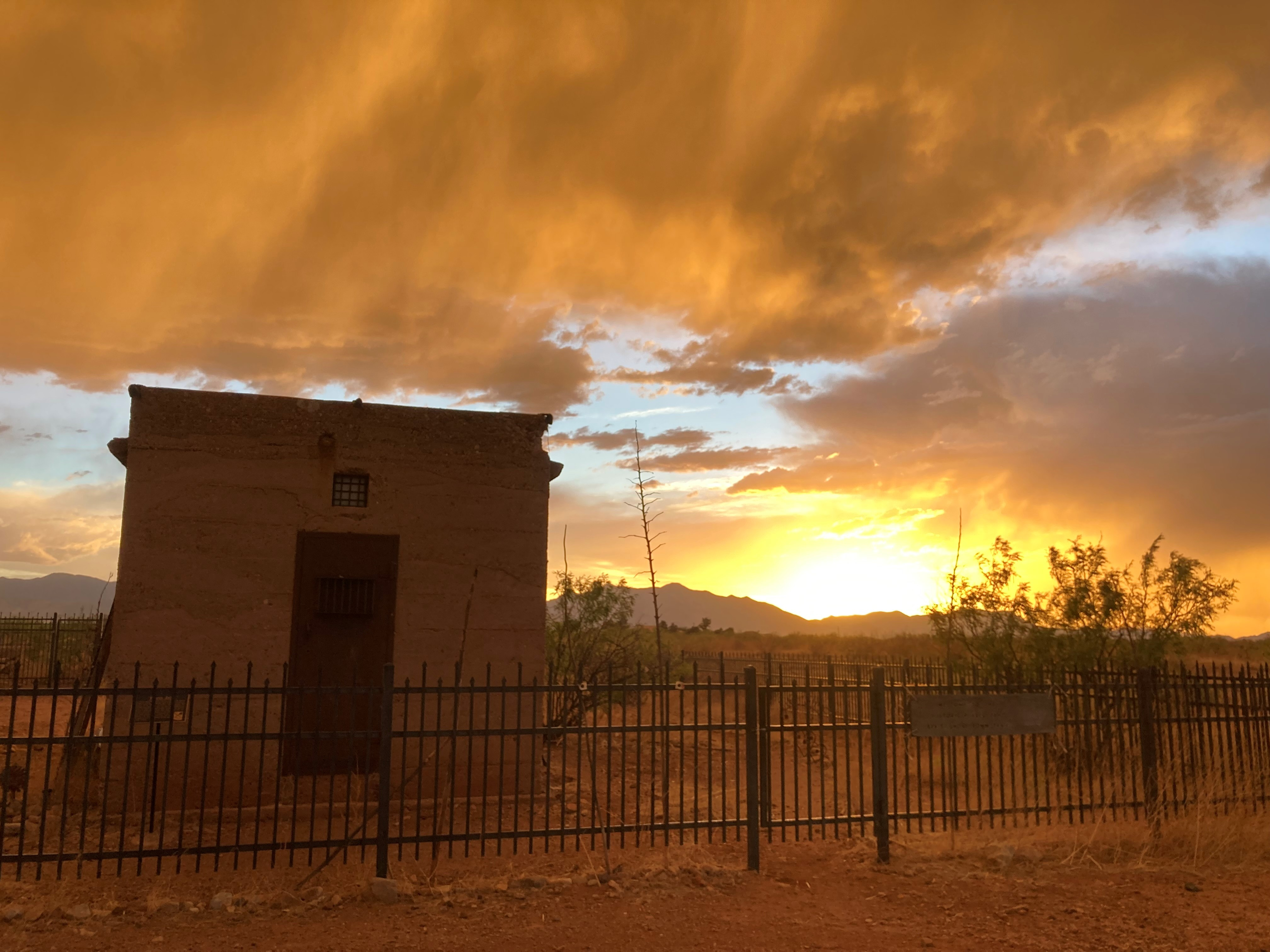
Historic Pearce Jail

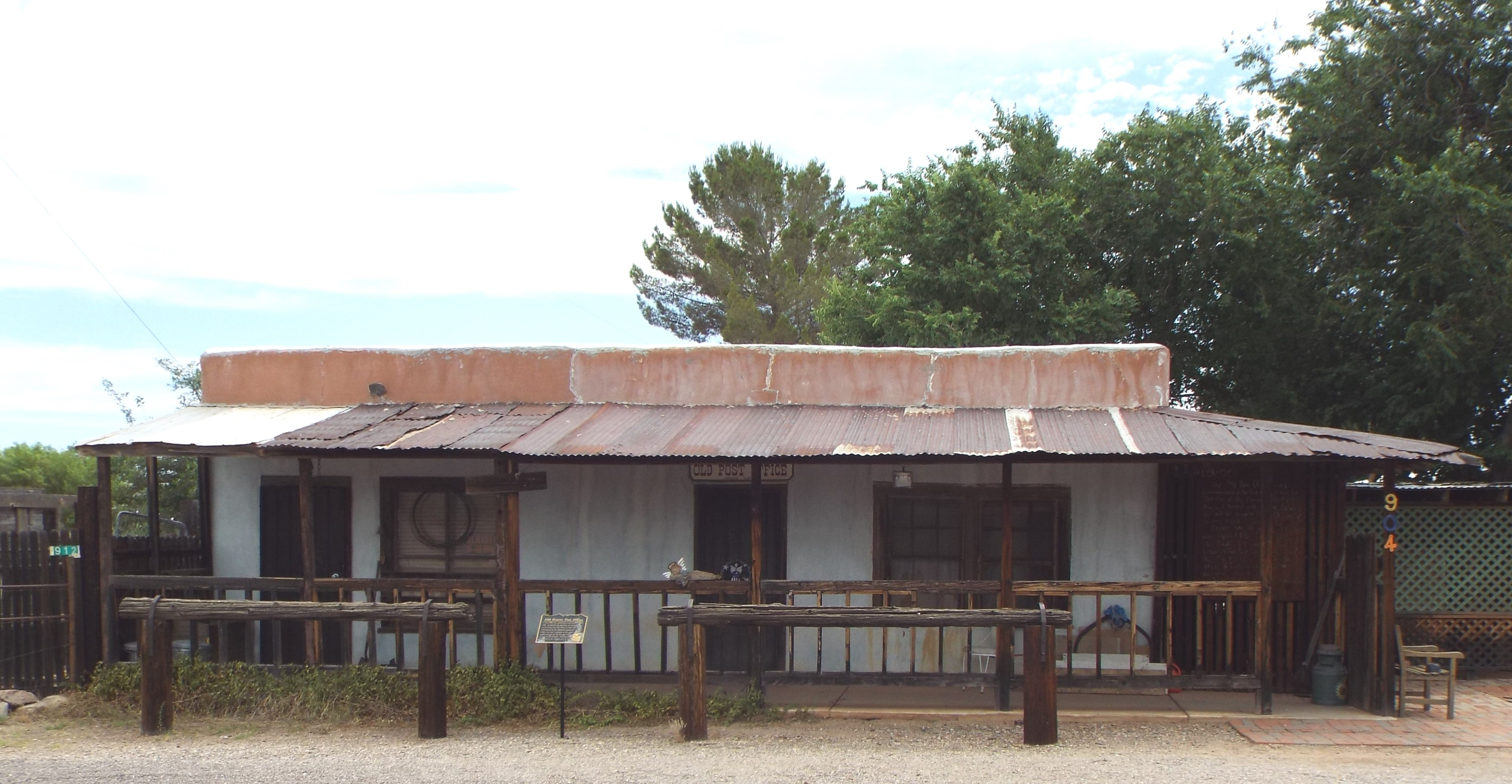
Historic Pearce Post Office, 1896

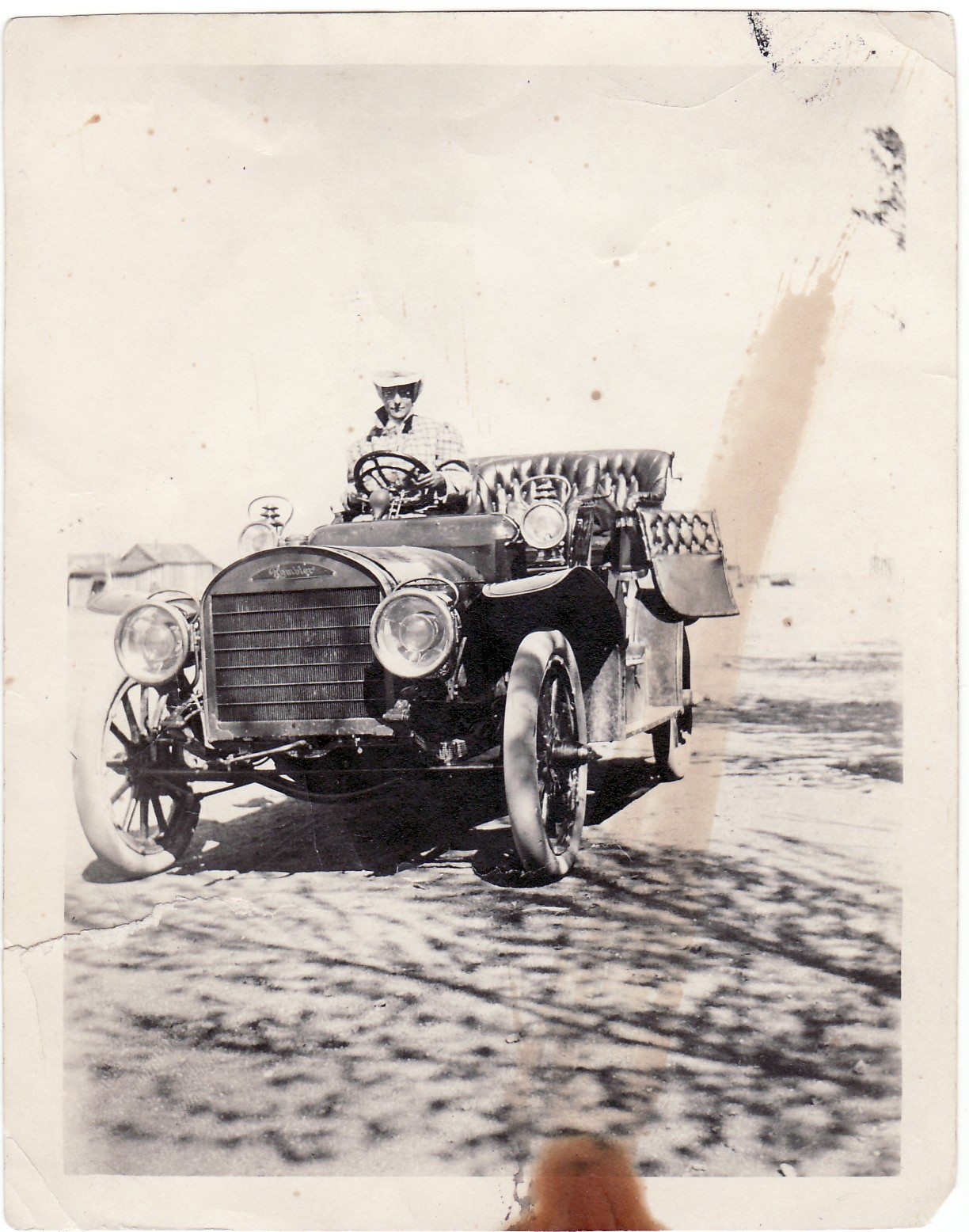
Effie Anderson Smith in her Rambler Touring Car, circa 1907, near her home in Pearce.

== See also ==
- Cochise County in the Old West
- Shootout at Wilson Ranch
- List of Old West gunfights

== Sources and external links ==
- Pearce Sunsites Chamber of Commerce
- Google map of Pearce–Sunsites
- Pearce and the Commonwealth Mine at Western Mining History. Includes many historic photos.
- Old Pearce Mercantile
- Pearce and Fittsburg ghost towns, includes photo gallery
- Pearce ghost town
