= Central School (Bisbee, Arizona) =

Historic school building in Bisbee, Arizona

- Central School in 2018

General information
- Architectural style: Italianate / Renaissance Revival
- Location: 43 Howell Avenue (also given as 47 Opera Drive), Bisbee, Arizona
- Current tenants: Central School Project
- Completed: 1905
- Cost: $52,000

Technical details
- Structural system: Gypsum block
- Floor count: 2 over a raised basement

Design and construction
- Architect: Frederick C. Hurst
- Main contractor: Boston & Brown
- Designations: Contributing property, Bisbee Historic District (NRHP, 1980)

The Central School is a former public school building in Bisbee, Arizona, United States. It was built in 1905 to designs by the local architect Frederick C. Hurst, and was the first school in Bisbee paid for with money from a bond issue. It is a contributing building in the Bisbee Historic District, which was listed on the National Register of Historic Places in 1980. Since 1994 the building has been owned by the Central School Project, a nonprofit arts center that rents studio space to artists.

== History ==
The school was built in 1905 on the site of an adobe school from 1893. Hurst designed it, and the contractors Boston & Brown built it for $52,000. According to the state historic property inventory, the lumber was shipped by schooner from Oregon to San Francisco and then brought to Arizona by rail. Hurst was then working as an engineer for Phelps Dodge. In the same period he also designed the Copper Queen Hospital, the Bisbee Woman's Club Clubhouse and the Copper Queen Library.

To pay for the building, the school district issued $75,000 in bonds. Before building could start, a friendly lawsuit between the school trustees and the Bank of Bisbee had to settle whether the bond sale had been properly advertised. After Judge Doane ruled for the trustees in May 1905, the board awarded the construction contract to Boston & Brown for $52,000. Work was to begin at once, and Hurst, who had drawn the plans, was to supervise construction. The cornerstone was laid on the afternoon of Sunday, July 30, 1905, with an address by Mayor Taylor and songs by schoolchildren. The stone, to be set in the wall to the left of the main entrance, was inscribed with the names of the school trustees (H. M. Woods, I. W. Wallace and S. W. Clawson), the superintendent of schools (C. F. Philbrook), the builders Boston & Brown, and the architect F. C. Hurst.

The building was still a school in 1977, when the district was surveyed. At that time it belonged to Bisbee School District No. 2. In 1982 artists renting space in the building formed a tenants' association, the Central School Project. It was incorporated in 1985, and in 1994 it bid on and bought the building from the local school district.

== Architecture ==
The district nomination describes the Central School as a building of gypsum block with a hipped roof, a belfry and a symmetrical plan with Italianate influence. The state inventory form adds that it stands on a stone foundation over a full raised basement, and that its belfry is square. SAH Archipedia calls the building Renaissance Revival. The restoration architects describe it as a three-story building of "jumbo cast stone blocks" with heavy timber roof framing. The nomination names Hurst as one of the two most active architects in the district, with the El Paso architect Henry Trost, and notes his "special affinity for cut stone".

== Central School Project ==
The Central School Project describes itself as a nonprofit arts and cultural center. Its mission has three parts: providing affordable studio space to working artists, preserving the Central School building, and fostering appreciation of the arts in Bisbee. Besides its preservation work, it has staged exhibitions, performance art, poetry readings, plays, concerts, dance, film events and children's workshops. Starting in 2009, Vint & Associates Architects of Tucson prepared a historic structure report and stabilization plans for the building. The first phase of work was completed in July 2011.
