= Bisbee Residential Historic District =

- U.S. National Register of Historic Places
- U.S. Historic district
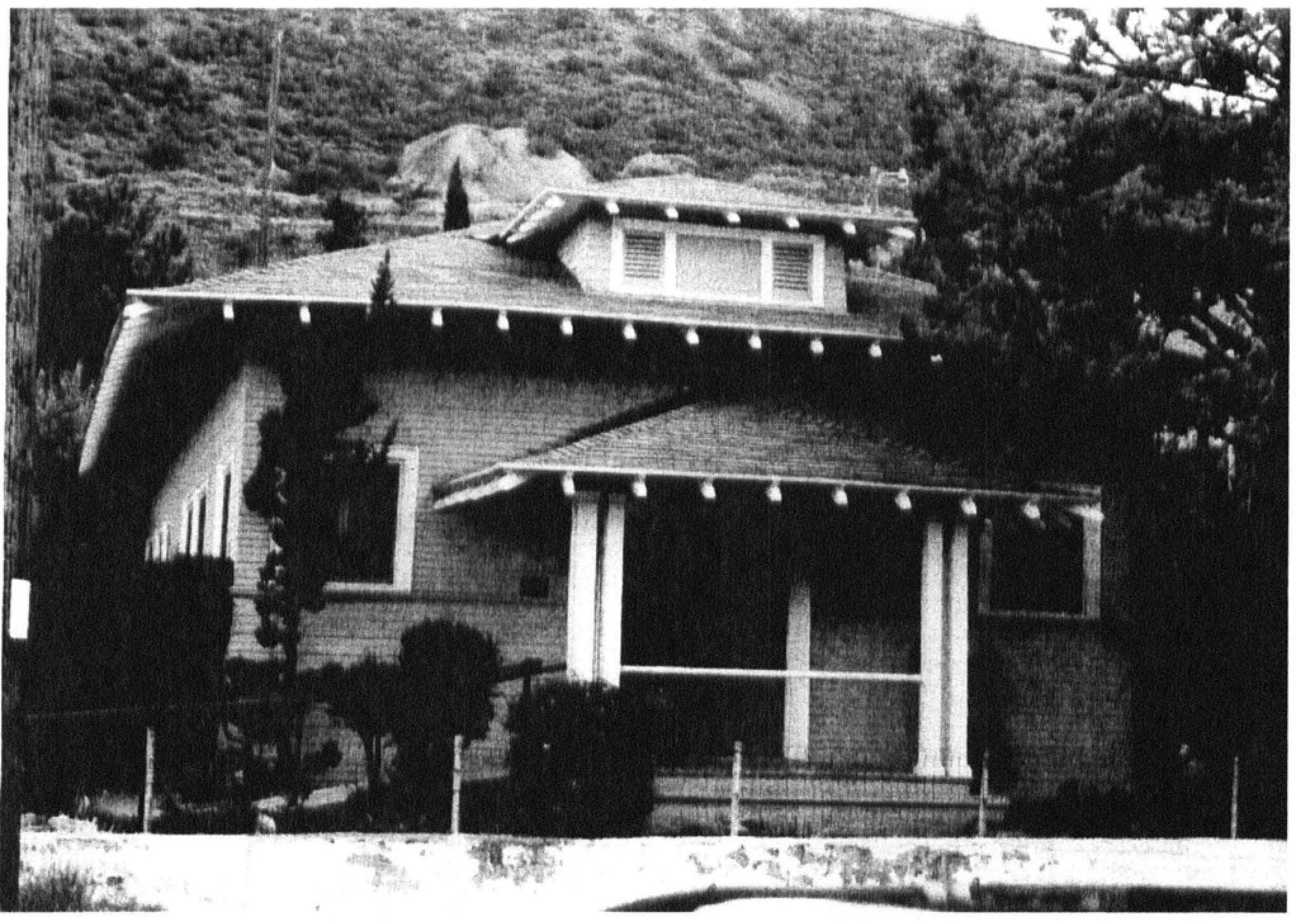
- Bisbee Women's Club

- Location within Arizona Location within the United States
- Location: Bisbee, Arizona
- Coordinates: 31°26′38″N 109°55′26″W
- NRHP reference No.: 10000233
- Added to NRHP: October 15, 2010

The Bisbee Residential Historic District is distinct from the Bisbee Historic District, and is located north and west of that district. It developed in the late 1880s and early 1900s, to support the booming mining industry. While it has some multi-family dwellings, commercial buildings, and a school, it is primarily composed of single family houses. It also has an extensive system of pedestrian walkways and stairways. Bisbee does not follow a grid pattern, rather its streets wind following the contour of the canyon and gulches. Developed prior to automobiles, it has narrow roads which are steep, and still remains a pedestrian-oriented town. It consists of over 500 contributing buildings and structures.

== Development of the town ==
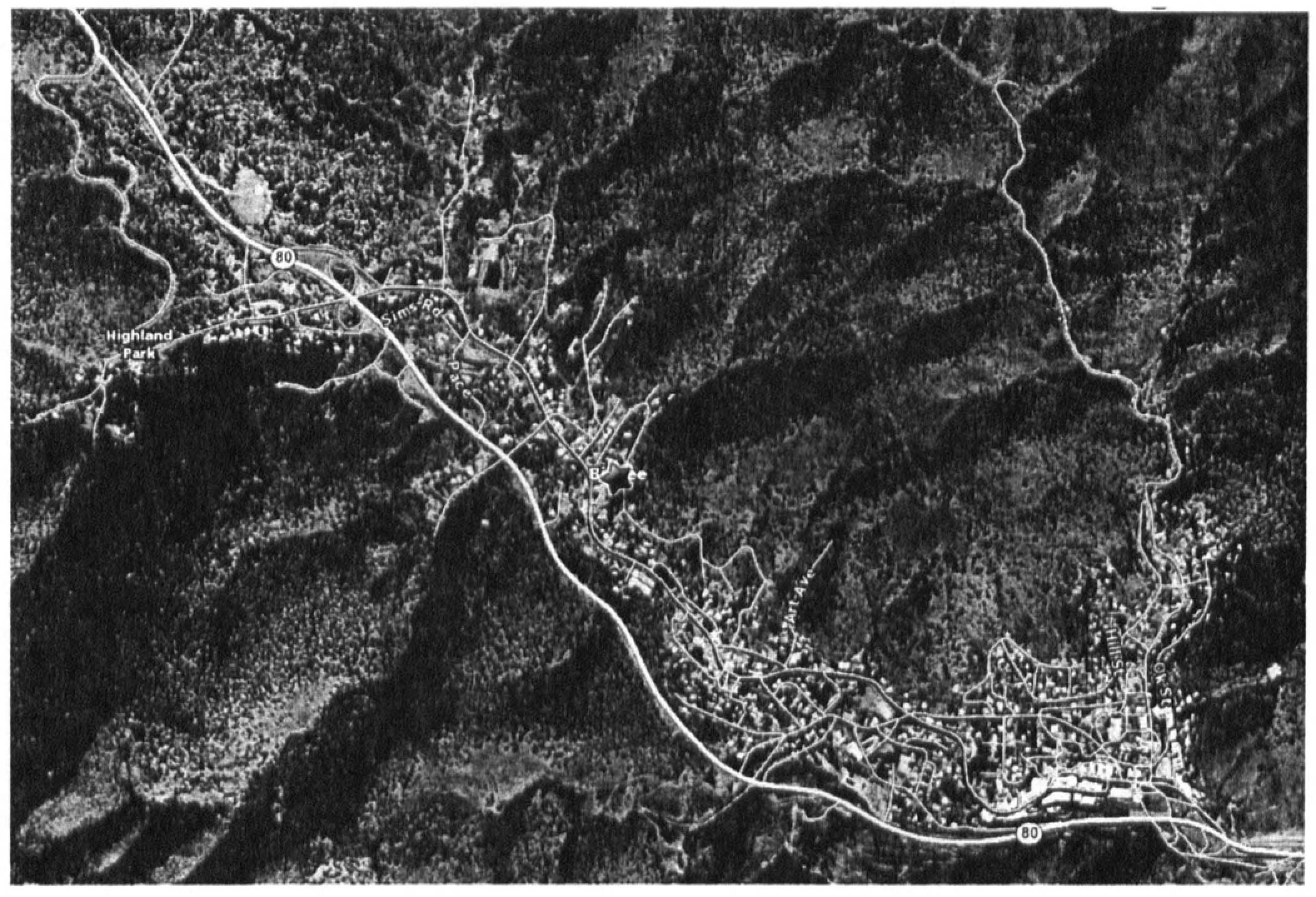
Aerial photo of Bisbee, Arizona, showing how town developed around land contours

Bisbee's development, like many western mining towns, was heavily influenced by local mining operations. The genesis of the town was the prospectors' camp, which was located near the entrance to the Copper Queen Mine and its adjacent smelter, to the west of the convergence of the Mule and Brewery Gulches. As the town expanded, it followed the natural topography of the area, following the natural drainage basins of the two canyons. The trail which followed Mule Gulch was called Tombstone Canyon Road, since that is where the trail headed. Tombstone was the initial seat of Cochise County, and the nearest neighbor to Bisbee at that time. That portion of the Tombstone Canyon Road directly west of its intersection with Brewery Gulch, came to be known as Main Street, and became the community's commercial street. It consisted mostly of two-story wooden buildings with arcades on the first floor and balconies on the second. There were several disastrous fires in the 1890s, after which the area was rebuilt with brick buildings, which gave it the appearance it continues to have to this day. A second commercial district, along the street named after the canyon, Brewery Gulch, containing restaurants, breweries, and Bisbee's first stock exchange. By the 1890s it had developed into the town's redlight district, with saloons, brothels, opium dens, and gambling houses. By the turn of the century the area contained a company hospital, company store, a company-built library, and the Copper Queen Hotel, built by and for the company in 1902.

The area had become an unpleasant, smoky area due to the heavy industrial activity, especially the smelter. When the smelting activity was relocated to Douglas, Arizona, only the commercial and residential aspects of the city remained.

== Description of the District ==
The Bisbee Residential Historic District is quite a bit larger than the Historic Commercial District, and is split into three sub-areas. The first of these sub-areas contains portions of Brewery Gulch and OK Street, adjacent to and north of the commercial district, extending northwards to Zacatecas Canyon. The second and largest sub-area is a residential area of Tombstone Canyon, northwest of the downtown area, and also includes historic development in several small side canyons. The third sub-area is the Quality Hill region of the town, southwest of downtown.

The Bisbee Residential Historic District begins at the south end of Brewery Gulch, proceeds north along Brewery Avenue, and enters the district where Taylor Street branches off to the west. As Brewery Avenue continues north, it follows the original contour of its precursor stream bed, and increasingly meanders in tightening zigzag curves without a single extended length of straight roadway. Brewery Avenue's streetscape consists of single story, sometimes contiguous frame dwellings predominantly lined along the lower part of the street and spaced further apart as the avenue winds farther north. Generally, while the bottom of the gulch slopes gradually to the west, its eastern bank rises quite steeply to a high but narrow terrace, or "bench," which supports the narrow, OK Street parallel to Brewery Avenue. A large number of scattered frame or box construction houses cling to slopes both above and below OK Street itself. Moving north, the two early brick Wills Boarding Houses come into view on the left, and on the right the brick Hotopp House is visible directly adjacent to the public stair climbing up to OK Street.

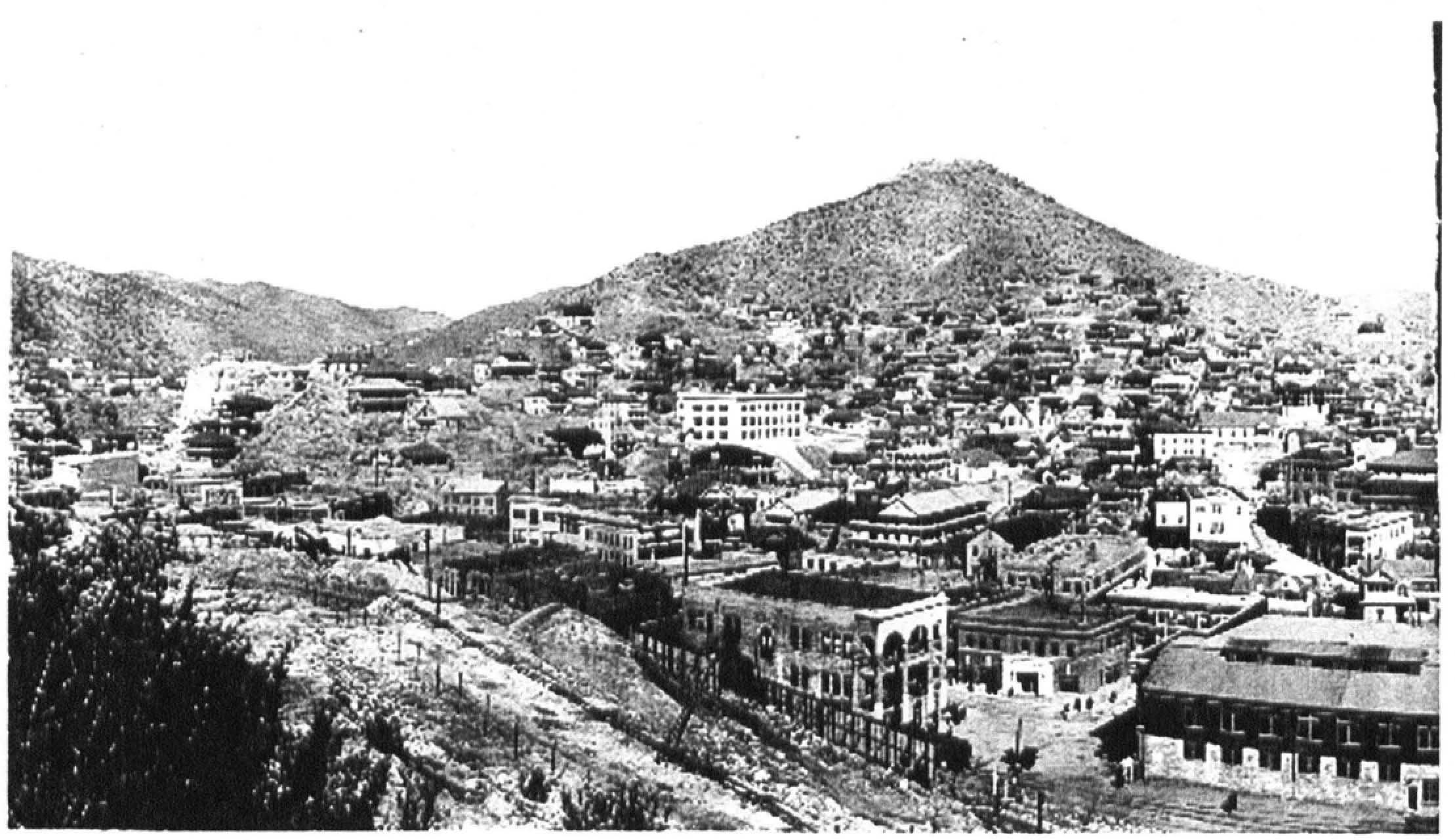
Bisbee, Arizona, ca. 1900

In the middle area of Brewery Avenue, houses almost fill the steeply sloped terrain that lies between Brewery Avenue and OK Street higher up; many of these houses can be reached only by flights of steps. Climbing the slope of Youngblood Hill Avenue on the right, one passes the Muheim House, a house-museum, on the left. On the right, the Youngblood Hill Avenue drainage channel runs along the length of the avenue. Returning to Brewery Avenue, and moving north past the Aira's Cash Grocery/Cranberry Mercantile/Mimosa Market on the right, the lower end of a WPA-era stair linking Brewery Avenue and OK Street is visible directly behind the Market. A short distance further north on Brewery Avenue, two structures on the left are the only surviving reminders of Bisbee's original red light district. These are a front foundation wall and set of steps of Mabel's cribs and Mabel's own house. Brewery Avenue continues generally north past houses spaced at increasing distances from one another, until arriving at the small Mexican-American settlement of Zacatecas Canyon, which developed around a community dance hall and cantina. Returning south on Brewery Avenue, and taking a right on Taylor Street, the road climbs up into the lower part of the School Hill neighborhood, entering the most intensively terraced and built up portion of the residential district. This area includes two- and three-story boarding houses as well as individual, mostly single story, wood-frame houses. Taylor Street terminates in a right-handed hairpin turn into Opera Drive, which contains a high density of terracing and house construction. Opera Drive continues a left-handed hairpin turn into Temby Avenue, which climbs still higher with mostly frame houses both above and below the road bed. Temby Avenue ends at Shearer Avenue, which in turn leads to Clawson Avenue, the southside of which marks the northern boundary between the existing downtown National Register district and the residential district. Clawson continues east past the First United Methodist Church, and the former Sagrado Corazon Church, later converted for residential use. Reversing direction, heading west on Clawson, one comes to the lower end of High Road, which starts upward as a switchback supported on massive concrete retaining walls (Br-652). High Road, as the name implies, leads to some of the highest home sites in the residential district, and ends at an informal overlook point providing a commanding view of Old Bisbee, including Sacramento Hill and the Lavender Pit.

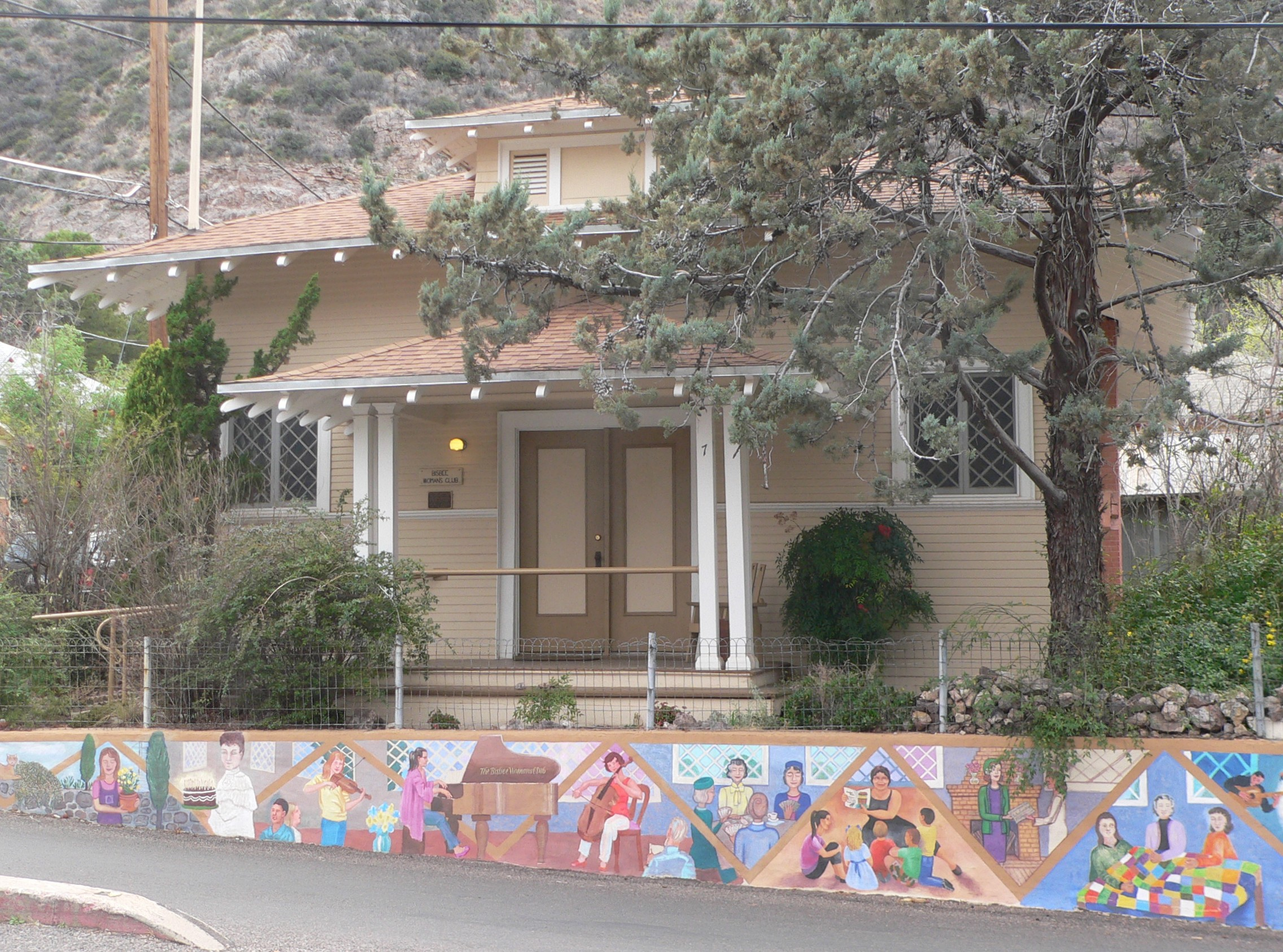
Bisbee Woman's Club from NE 3

Returning on High Road to Clawson, descending Clawson to its western end, and then crossing Tombstone Canyon Road, the Quality Hill neighborhood is entered at the lower end of Ledge Avenue. Climbing east on Ledge, the road passes, on the right, the former Horace Mann Junior High School, now Cochise County Administrative Building, and then as it turns right to climb up Cross Avenue, it passes the Bisbee Woman's Club. Continuing up Cross Avenue past frame houses on both sides, leads to Quality Hill Plaza, an informal paved space once known as "Queen Place" in recognition of the important role the Copper Queen Consolidated Mining Company played as developer of housing for its elite on Quality Hill. The plaza still functions as an informal social center for the Quality Hill neighborhood. Company-built houses that face onto Quality Hill Plaza include the Sherman House, the Johnson House, and the Presbyterian Manse, or church rectory. Other Quality Hill residences are reached from either side of a long public stair, which climbs from Tombstone Canyon Road to the top end of Ledge Avenue. Exiting the northwest corner of Quality Hill Plaza leads back to where Cross Avenue turns into Quality Hill Road, which in turn leads to a left on Key Street, and a cluster of frame houses. Continuing west on Quality Hill Road leads, on the right, to the top end of Quality Hill Walk, a long concrete WPA stair with another cluster of frame houses. The stair descends down to Ledge Avenue, immediately adjacent to Horace Mann Junior High School.

Descending Quality Hill Road, then passing briefly through the westernmost portion of the Bisbee Commercial Historic District, one comes to Quarry Canyon Road and the Higgins Hill neighborhood, containing mostly medium to large upper-class mostly frame houses on Quarry Canyon and the parallel Higgins Roads. Significant examples include an early architect's residence, the Hurst House, and a large, luxurious boarding house, both on Quarry Canyon. Continuing west into the Mason Hill neighborhood, significant examples on two parallel streets include the early Mason House, the Michael J. Brophy House, and a Craftsman style house, all on Oak Street, as well as the Coles/Overlock House on O'Hare Street. Near the top of Quarry Canyon Avenue, Roberts Avenue branches off to the right. Another public concrete stair descends from Roberts Avenue down to Tombstone Canyon Road. This stair negotiates a steeply pitched slope down to Perley Avenue, which provides sole access from its landing to a total of six houses. Returning along Quarry Canyon Avenue and then heading west on Tombstone Canyon Road, one passes by the south edge of the Tank Hill neighborhood, where a good example of box construction can be seen at 215 Tombstone Canyon. Proceeding west leads to a complex of buildings located on either side of a small side-canyon between Tank Hill and Art Hill. Among these buildings are 225B Tombstone Canyon, a good example of a vernacular pyramidal cottage, and a former Mormon Church, adaptively used as apartments. Moving further west, Art Avenue follows another very steep side-canyon on the north side, with WPA concrete street paving, and a closely-spaced cluster of frame and box-construction houses. Along the line of Art Hill Gulch well beyond the house cluster, there is a succession of five CCC/SCS-built rubble stone check dams, the uppermost of which carries a foot trail across the gulch. Moving back to the left side of Tombstone Canyon, one can see high concrete retaining walls, probably built by the WPA. Opposite these walls Garden Avenue forks right from Tombstone Canyon and runs parallel to it along the canyon floor, one of the few flat areas of Old Bisbee. Passing by 416 Garden, a two-story 20th century commercial building, which originally housed a neighborhood store downstairs and an apartment above, one can see its side bearing walls made of regionally produced, soft gypsum blocks. The top courses of these walls show a pattern of weathering erosion typical of this material.

Slightly to the northwest of Garden Road is the Laundry Hill neighborhood. Laundry Hill Road originally intersected Garden, but no longer does so. Currently, access to the small cluster of houses in the neighborhood is by several long public stairs or via Moon Canyon Avenue and Adams Avenue high above the canyon. On the opposite side of Tombstone from Garden, Brophy Avenue branches off to the left, runs past seven smaller-scale fran1e houses on either side, then rejoins Tombstone again, forming a miniature linearly-ananged neighborhood by itself. Continuing west on Tombstone Canyon, the Mule Gulch Channel is visible running along the north side of the road, along a stretch of flat land between Tombstone and Mayor Street (a smaller street running parallel to Tombstone). Crossing the channel is a concrete bridge built by the WPA, with both cast and mounted bronze logos of the agency on its sidewalk surface. A number of larger and somewhat later houses are located on Mayor Street, as well as some smaller houses further up the hill to the north. These are accessed by concrete stairways. Somewhat further up Tombstone Canyon is the City Fire Station, which has access to the street by a bridge over the channel. Continuing west on Tombstone Avenue, several residential roads branch off to follow small drainages rising from the main course of Tombstone Canyon. These include Star Avenue to the north, and Spring Canyon to the south, each with groupings of houses on both sides. Pace Avenue, on the south, provides access to Garfield Elementary School, currently adaptively used as a bed-and-breakfast. The school's playground retaining wall was built by the WPA. The final side-canyon residential areas are along Locklin Avenue and Wood Canyon both diverging to the north side of Tombstone Avenue. At the southeast comer of Wood Canyon and Tombstone Avenue is the City Pump House, rebuilt by the WPA, and with a dated plaque on its east side.

A short distance further west on the right hand side of Tombstone Canyon is an excellent example of a post-World War I vernacular bungalow residence. Continuing west under the bridge, which carries US Route 80 over Tombstone Canyon, an unusually large-scale Craftsman style residence is visible. This house may be a prefabricated Sears-type "kit" house. Pueblo Court, Bisbee's first motel is seen on the north side of Tombstone Avenue, among the group of "suburban"-spaced houses on both sides of the road, on generous-sized lots.

== See also ==
- Bisbee Historic District
