= St. Patrick's Roman Catholic Church (Bisbee, Arizona) =

Historic church in Arizona, United States

- U.S. National Register of Historic Places
- U.S. Historic district – Contributing property
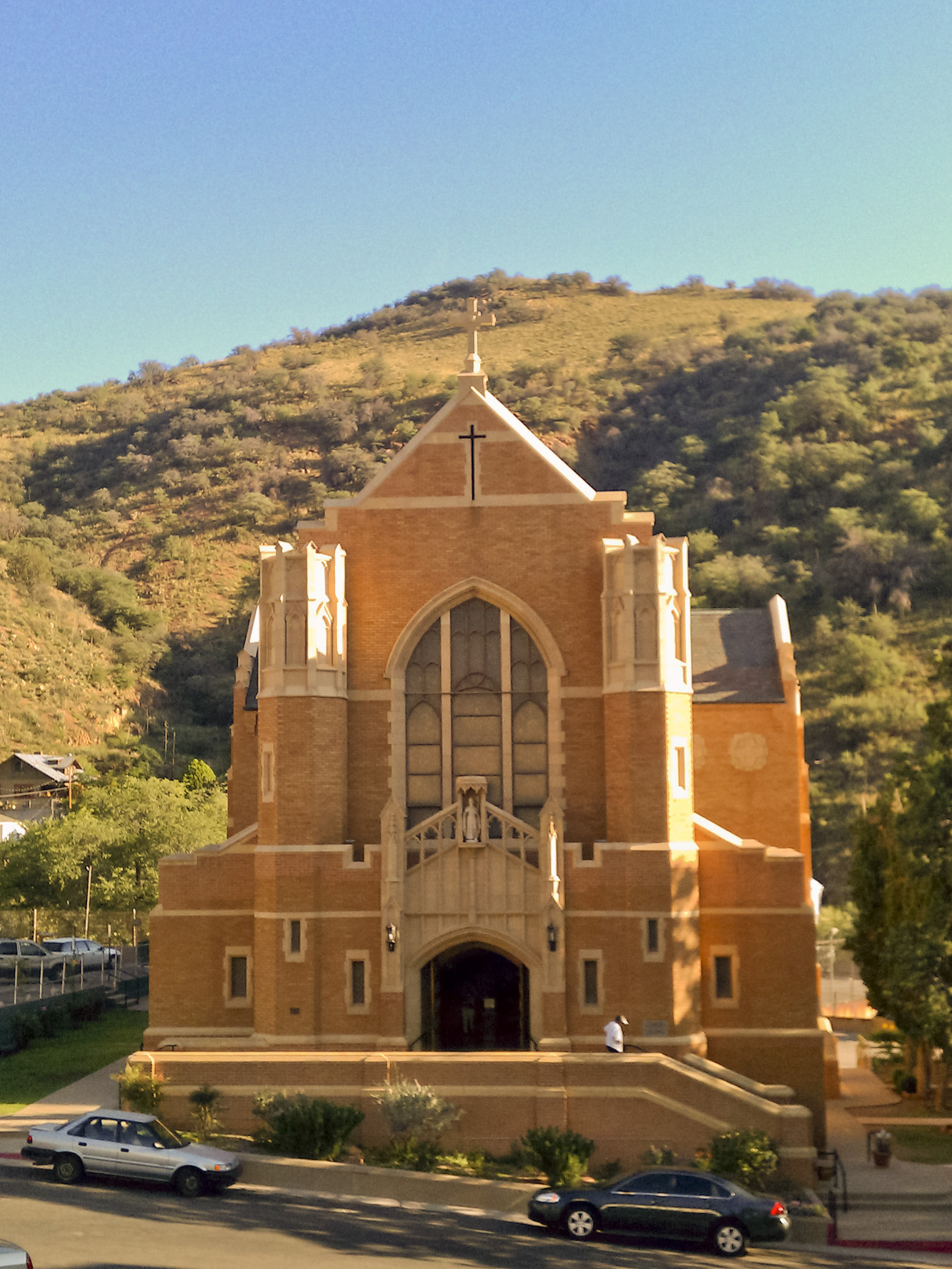

- Location within Arizona Location within the United States
- Location: Oak Ave., on Higgins Hill, Bisbee, Arizona
- Coordinates: 31°26′40″N 109°55′19″W
- Area: less than one acre
- Built: 1915
- Built by: John Steffes
- Architect: Albert C. Martin
- Architectural style: Late Gothic Revival
- Part of: Bisbee Historic District (ID80004487)
- NRHP reference No.: 95001080

Significant dates
- Added to NRHP: September 7, 1995
- Designated CP: July 3, 1980

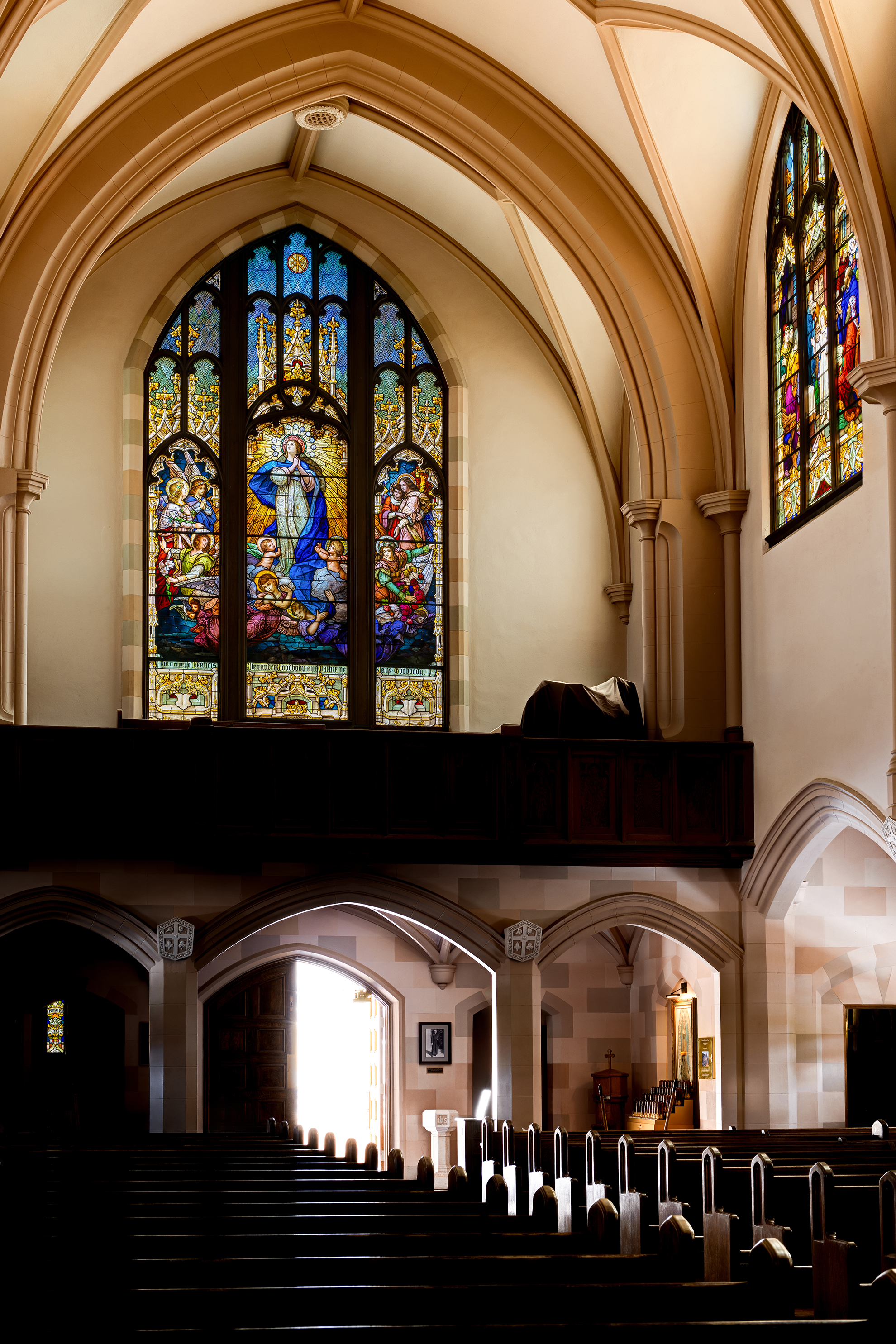
Stained glass window ''The Assumption of the Virgin Mary'' in St Patrick Catholic Church

St. Patrick's Roman Catholic Church is a historic church on Oak Avenue, on Higgins Hill in Bisbee, Arizona, United States. It was built in 1915 and added to the National Register of Historic Places in 1995.

It was designed by architect Albert C. Martin of Los Angeles.

It was deemed significant "because it embodies distinct characteristics of the Late Gothic Revival period of architecture and high artistic value in its decorative fittings, most specifically the stained glass windows and alters."

It is a contributing building in the Bisbee Historic District.

It is located about 200 feet up Higgins Hill, on the southerly side of Tombstone Canyon.
