= Copper Queen Library and Post Office =

Historic library and post office building in Bisbee, Arizona

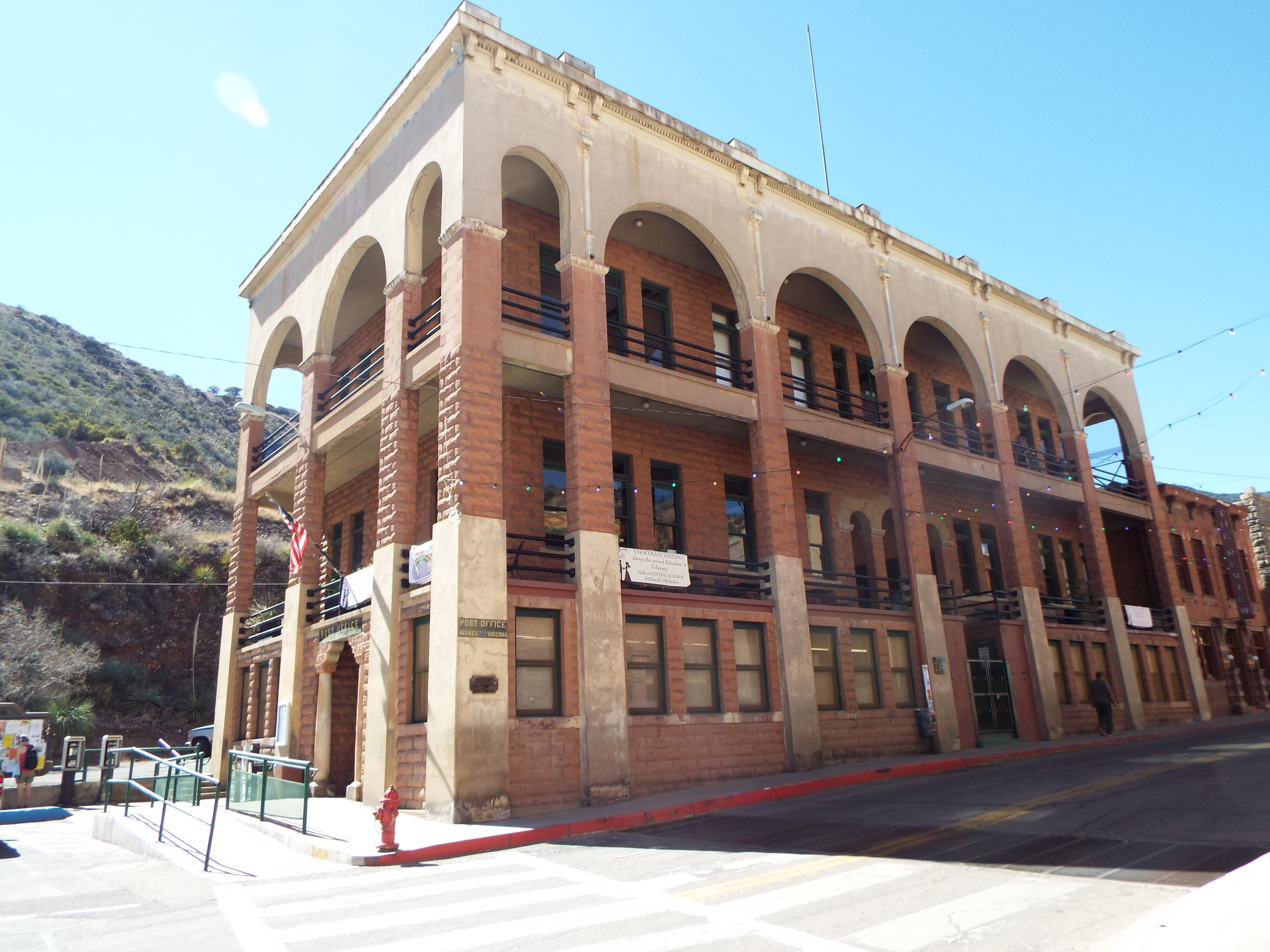
- The building in 2016

General information
- Architectural style: Renaissance Revival
- Location: 6 Main Street, Bisbee, Arizona
- Coordinates: 31.4415°N 109.9154°W
- Current tenants: Copper Queen Library; U.S. Post Office
- Construction started: 1906
- Completed: 1907
- Owner: City of Bisbee

Technical details
- Structural system: Concrete and gypsum block
- Floor count: 3

Design and construction
- Architect: Frederick C. Hurst
- Designations: Contributing property, Bisbee Historic District (NRHP, 1980)

The Copper Queen Library and Post Office is a three-story building on Main Street in Bisbee, Arizona, United States. It was designed by the local architect Frederick C. Hurst and built in 1906–07. Since then it has housed a U.S. post office on the ground floor and the Copper Queen Library on the top floor. The library was founded in 1882 and is described as the oldest continuously operating library in Arizona. The building is a contributing property in the Bisbee Historic District.

== History ==
Executives of the Copper Queen mining company organized Bisbee's lending library in 1882, with 400 donated volumes kept in the company's store. In 1885 the company gave it a two-story wood-frame building, which it shared with the town's post office. That building and its books burned in 1888. A brick replacement opened in 1892 and stood until 1906, when it was demolished to make way for the present building.

By 1904 the post office had moved to Brewery Gulch. When the company announced plans for a new library building in 1906, townspeople petitioned the governor to have the post office moved into its ground floor. In January 1907 the Bisbee Daily Review reported that the post office room in the new library building was getting its finishing touches, and that the postmaster planned to move the office the following Saturday night. According to the state historic property inventory, the building was not occupied until January 1907 because supplies were delayed. The City of Bisbee dates the library's opening in the new building to March 1907. Because Bisbee had no home delivery, by 1908 its post office had more rented lock boxes (3,200) than any other post office in the country. It also had the nation's only all-female postal staff.

The building was one of several public buildings erected wholly or partly by Phelps Dodge, the owner of the Copper Queen mine. Phelps Dodge gave the library to the City of Bisbee in April 1976, after mining in Bisbee ended, and the Friends of the Copper Queen Library was founded that November. The building was later renovated and an elevator was added. The city's history puts this work in 1997, and SAH Archipedia in 2007.

In 2019 Library Journal named the Copper Queen Library the best small library in America. In 2024 it received the National Medal for Museum and Library Service.

== Architecture ==
The building has a polygonal footprint on a wedge-shaped site between Main and Commerce streets. It faces the space known locally as Post Office Plaza, at the entrance to Bisbee's commercial district. The district nomination describes Main Street as entered between two landmarks, the Bank of Bisbee and this building. The walls are concrete and gypsum block. The blocks, made in Douglas in sizes of 12 by 24 and 16 by 32 inches, were treated to look like brownstone. The building has a rusticated front, classical columns, and porches on the north and east sides at the second and third floors. These sit behind full-height arches, and a simple cornice with dentils and brackets runs along the top. The 1978 survey classed the style as Second Renaissance Revival influence. SAH Archipedia calls it "modestly Renaissance Revival" and "one of the most distinctive buildings in Bisbee".

As built, the post office took the first floor, reading, game and card rooms the second, and the library the third.
