= Bisbee Historic District =

- U.S. National Register of Historic Places
- U.S. Historic district
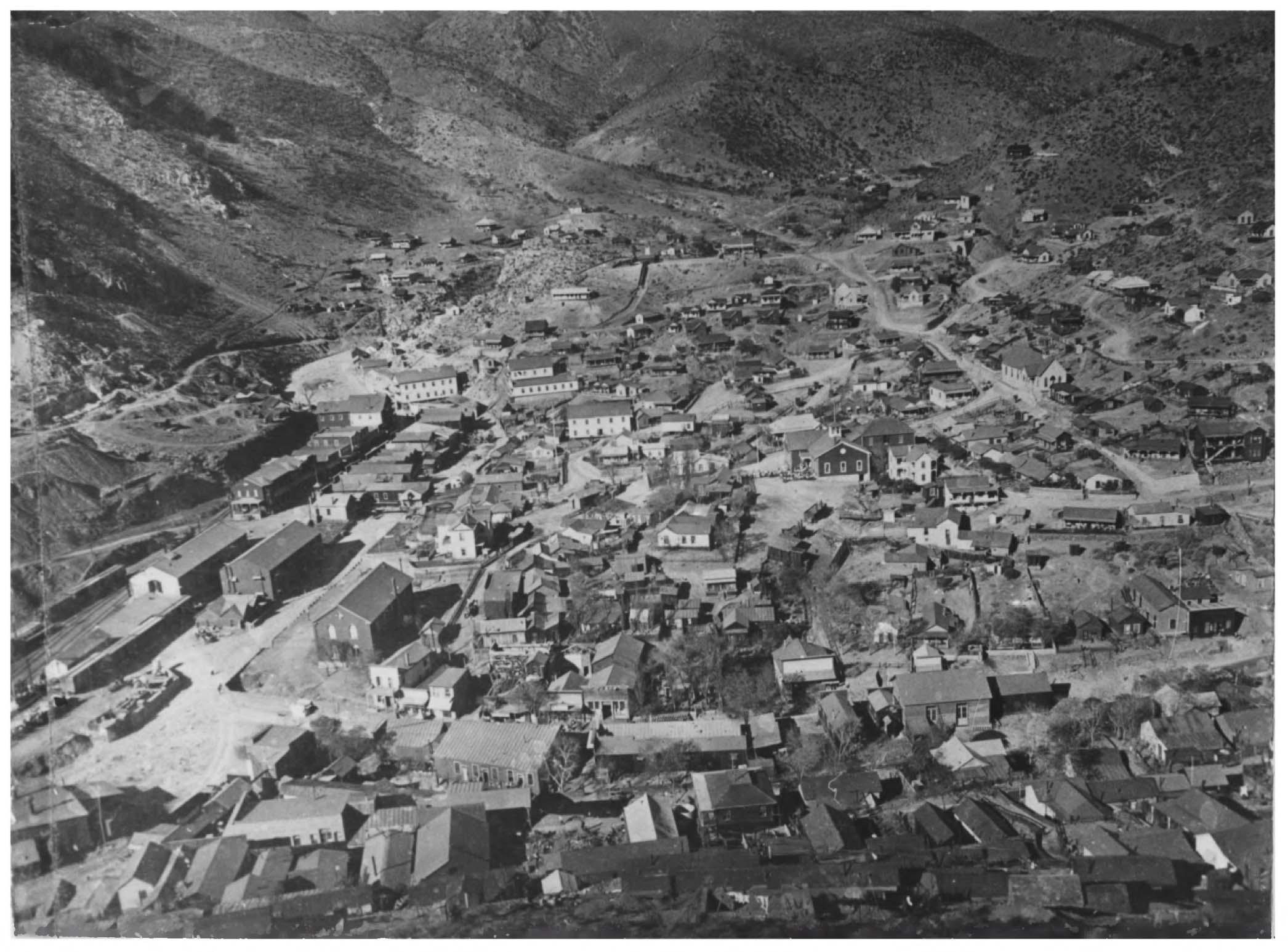
- Bisbee, ca. 1895

- Location within Arizona Location within the United States
- Location: off US 80, Bisbee, Arizona, U.S.
- Coordinates: 31°26′34″N 109°54′50″W
- Area: 250 acres (1.0 km^{2})
- Architectural style: Colonial Revival, Mission/Spanish Revival, Victorian Italianate
- NRHP reference No.: 80004487
- Added to NRHP: July 3, 1980

The Bisbee Historic District is a historic district located in Bisbee, Arizona, and has all the essential features of a prosperous, early twentieth century mining town. It has been listed on the National Register of Historic Places in 1980. The district has 80 contributing buildings, with various architectural styles including Colonial Revival, Mission Revival/Spanish Revival, and Italianate architecture.

== History ==
The Historic District's history is tied with that of the Phelps Dodge Company, one of the great industrial corporations of the 20th century. Once the company began operations in the Bisbee area, it dominated the town's economy, as well as the town's physical and social development. The District mirrors this fact, being an example of an early twentieth-century mining company town. Prior to the arrival of Phelps Dodge, the area was a hub for mining activity. Rich veins of ore were discovered by the U. S. Army in the nearby Mule Mountains in 1877, with the Copper Queen Mine being founded that year. The following year the town saw its first smelter, and financial capitalists from both the east and west coast began to invest heavily in the area. The mining camp developed into a town by 1880, and was named Bisbee, after Judge DeWitt Bisbee, who was a heavy investor in the area. While the town was still small, the mining activity in it and nearby Tombstone, Arizona, focused most of the territory's population into these remote areas. The formation of Cochise County soon followed in 1881, with Tombstone as the county seat. In 1881, James Douglas of the Phelps Dodge Company convinced his company to purchase the claims adjoining the Copper Queen Mine. They began operations, with Douglas in charge of the site. It was the beginning of a highly successful mining operation, which resulted in over $2 billion worth of ore being produced in the area around Bisbee, the majority of it in properties owned by Phelps Dodge.

One of the largest issues with the location was transportation. Supplies had to be brought in by wagon, and ore and to be sent the same way to the nearest railhead in Benson. Production increased, and in 1886, new, larger smelters were built, and eventually rose to over 100 tons of freight per day. The Southern Pacific railway refused to build a line from Bisbee to Benson, so in 1894 Phelps Dodge built its own rail line to Benson. By 1900 the new smelters could no longer keep up with production, but lack of water prevented larger ones from being built in Bisbee, so a new smelter town sprang up near the Mexico-United States Border, Douglas, named so after James Douglas.

As the copper industry went, so went Bisbee. In 1881, the town had a population of 300, most of whom lived in tents. By 1884 the population had risen to 500, and the first wood and adobe structures began to be constructed, replacing the tents. In the next six years the town began to expand rapidly, and had a population of 1500 in 1890. Brick buildings began to appear on Main Street. Frame cottages began to be constructed on the hillsides around the city. More affluent areas developed around Quality Hill and Higgins Hill. Brewery Gulch became congested as the center of activity for the miners. The street had businesses packed side by side along the street, including saloons, shops, and lodging houses. Further along Brewery Gulch was the red light district. 1902 saw the incorporation of the town, and the three main streets Main, Howell, and Brewery, were paved with bricks. The population had exploded to 10,000 by 1904, and electric lights and gas were added to the town the same year. Streetcars came to the town in 1908, and ran until 1929, when they were replaced by buses. As the town prospered, it gained in prominence, and in 1929 the Cochise County seat was moved from Tombstone to Bisbee. The courthouse, of art deco design, was completed in 1931.

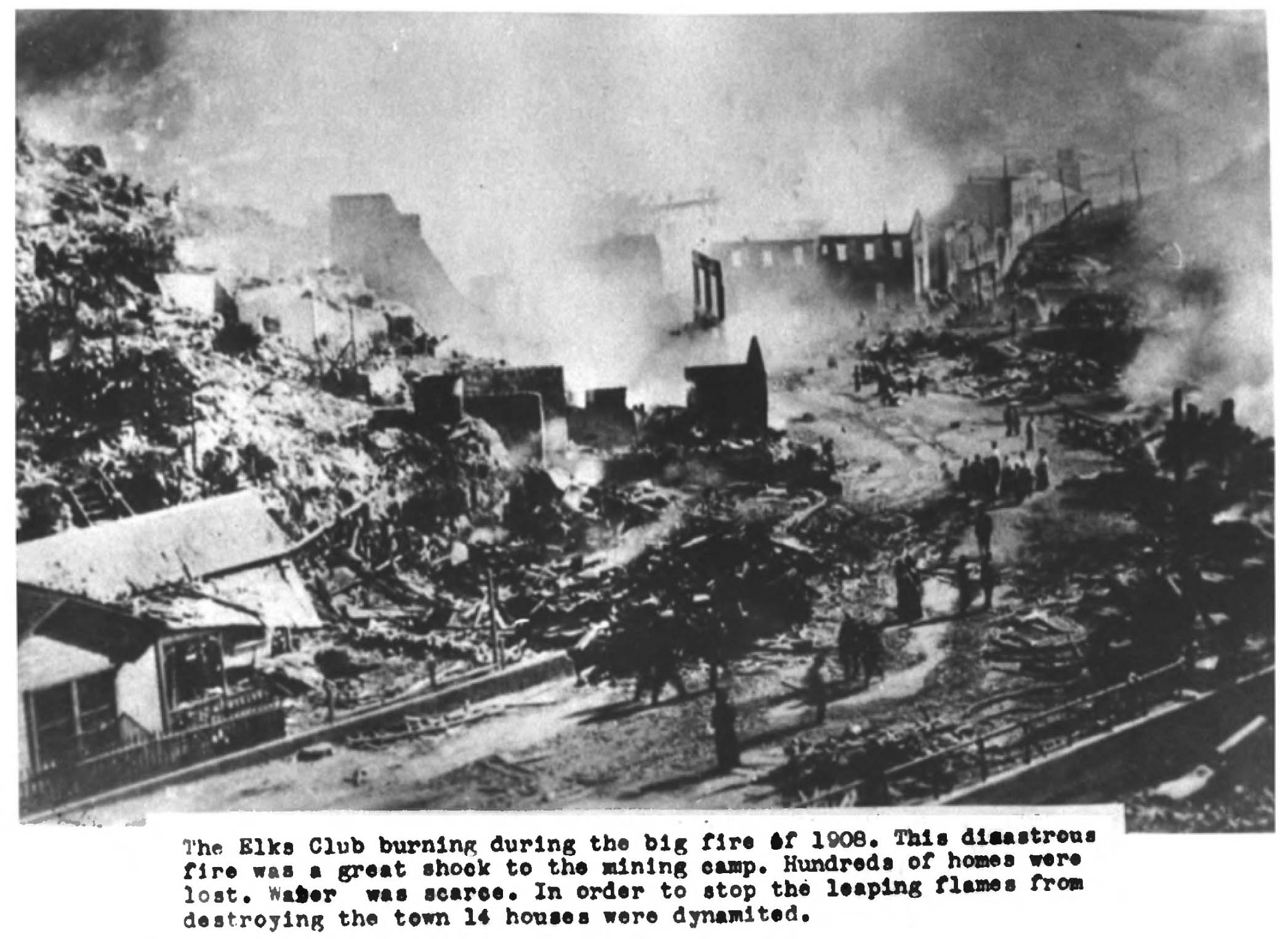
Bisbee, Arizona 1908 fire

The town's geography and location caused the town to be prone to fires and floods. The Historic District experienced severe flooding in 1886, 1890, and 1908. The 1890 flood saw a 20-foot wall of water sweep through the town one night. The 1908 flood deposited several feet of mud and debris in the post office, and that same year a fire devastated the commercial area of Main Street, causing $500,000 worth of damage. Following these disasters, the town paid for flood abatement systems to be put in place, as well as a public water system to provide for fire-fighting.

The mining industry supported the town for approximately the first 75 years of the twentieth century, although large scale development of the town ended by the end of World War I, with lower mining production. The industry was suppressed by large wartime stockpiles, without the military market of a wartime economy. That was exacerbated by large copper deposits being discovered in South America. The 1920s saw the town gradually reviving, until the Great Depression set in. As the grade of ore decreased, new methods were employed. The Sacramento Hill was an open pit mine from 1917 through 1929, and the Lavender Pit, one of the largest open-pit copper mines in the world, was in operation from 1951 to 1974. In 1975 the Copper Queen Mine ceased operations, and by this time the mining around Bisbee had become a small part of the operations of Phelps Dodge. The mine closures were severe blows to the town's economy.

== Description ==
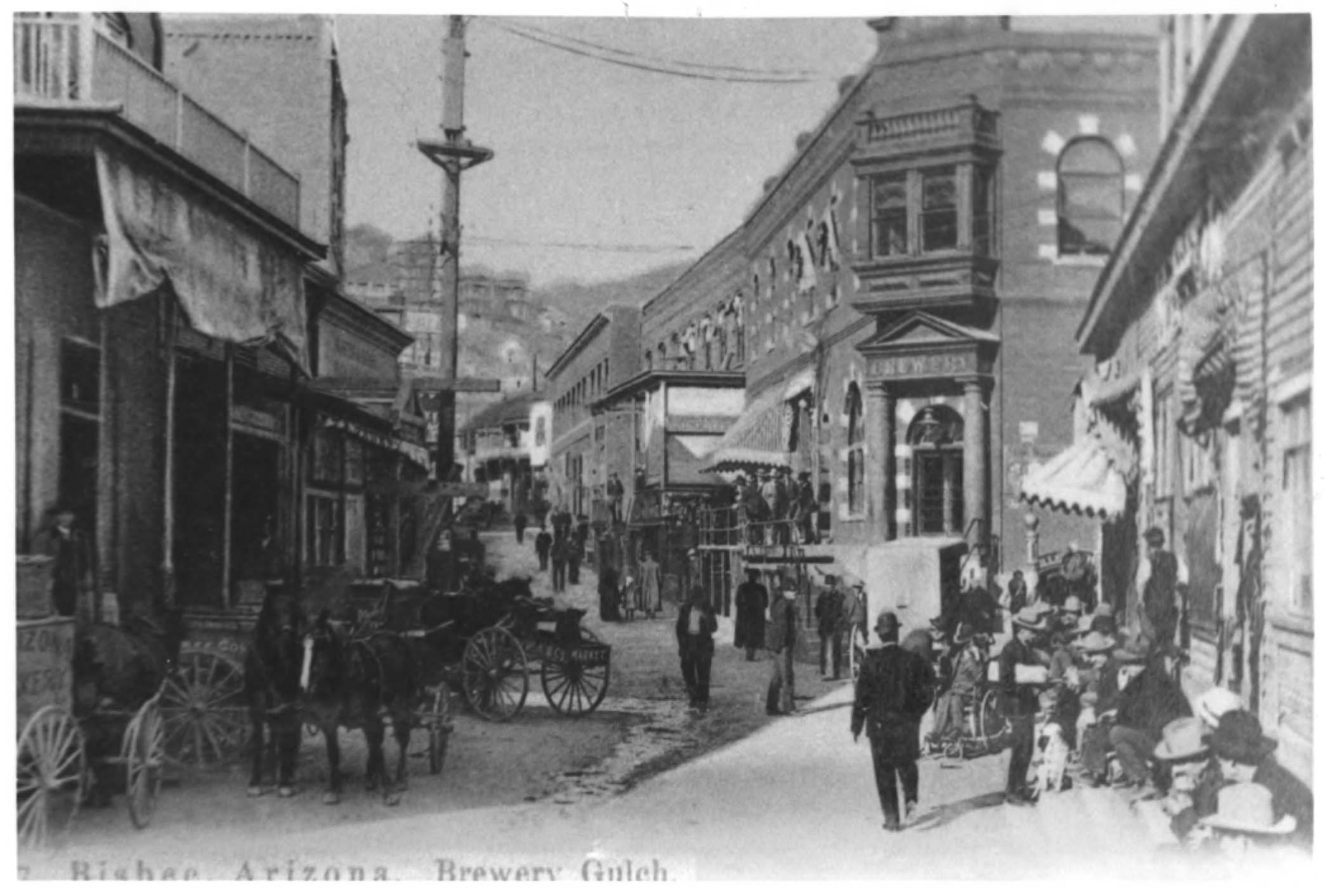
Brewery Gulch, 1904

The area is a dense combination of commercial buildings, residential houses, and institutional structures sitting side by side along several narrow streets, the two main ones being Main Street and Brewery Gulch. These include lodging houses, governmental, educational and religious buildings. Most of the structures were built being 1890 and 1915. The district is an irregular wedge-shaped area, with its apex at the intersection of Main Street and Clawson Avenue. This portion of the district contains the County Courthouse, St. Patrick's Church, and the Loretto Academy. At the other end of the wedge, formed by O.K. Street and Brewery Gulch, sits an historic City Park and the Phelps Dodge General Office Building. In between these perimeter streets are several major and minor streets. There is a plaza, which fronts another Phelps Dodge building, the Mercantile. To the west of the Plaza are the entrances to Subway Alley and Main Street. Subway Alley is home to the Copper Queen Hospital, the Fair Building and its annex.

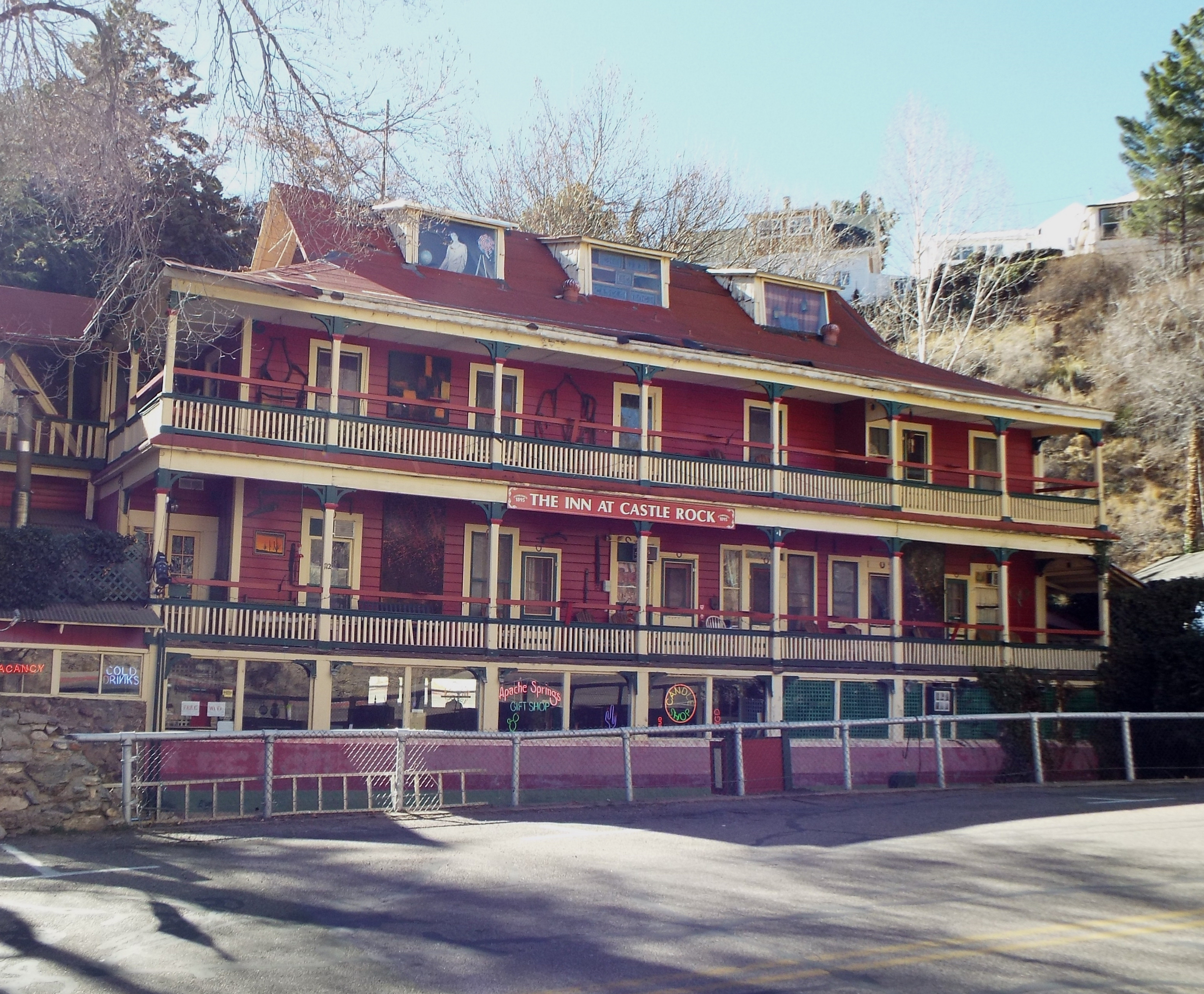
Castle Rock Hotel

Main street includes the Bank of Bisbee, the Copper Queen Library, the Post Office, the Anguis Building, the First Baptist Church, and the Castle Rock Hotel. After the hotel, Main Street turns into a more residential street, with one- and two-story houses. At its other end is the courthouse. Clawson also has numerous residential buildings, but also includes the Bisbee High School. Howell Avenue, running between Clawson and Brewery Gulch, contains St. John's Episcopal Church, the YWCA Building, and the Copper Queen Hotel. Mansfield is a short street, connecting with Clawson. Opera Drive winds around the district, and contains the YMCA, the Central School, and passes to the east of the City Park. On the western side of the Park, Brewery Gulch and O.K. Street run downhill toward Queen Avenue and Naco Road, and has a dense concentration of buildings. One of the highlights of this section is the Pythian Castle with its clock tower. Near the Castle are several of the lodging houses, which were built for the miners who worked in the nearby mines.

The district contains buildings over a wide swath of uses: hotels, lodging houses, social lodges, churches, schools, residences, and government buildings. They are normally of frame, adobe, or block construction. The larger buildings are usually constructed with brick, steel, or concrete. Some of the architectural styles in the district include Victorian Italianate, Second Renaissance Revival, Sullivanesque, Art Deco, Streamline Modern, Neo-Classical Revival, Gothic Revival, Mission Revival, and Colonial Revival.

== Architecture ==
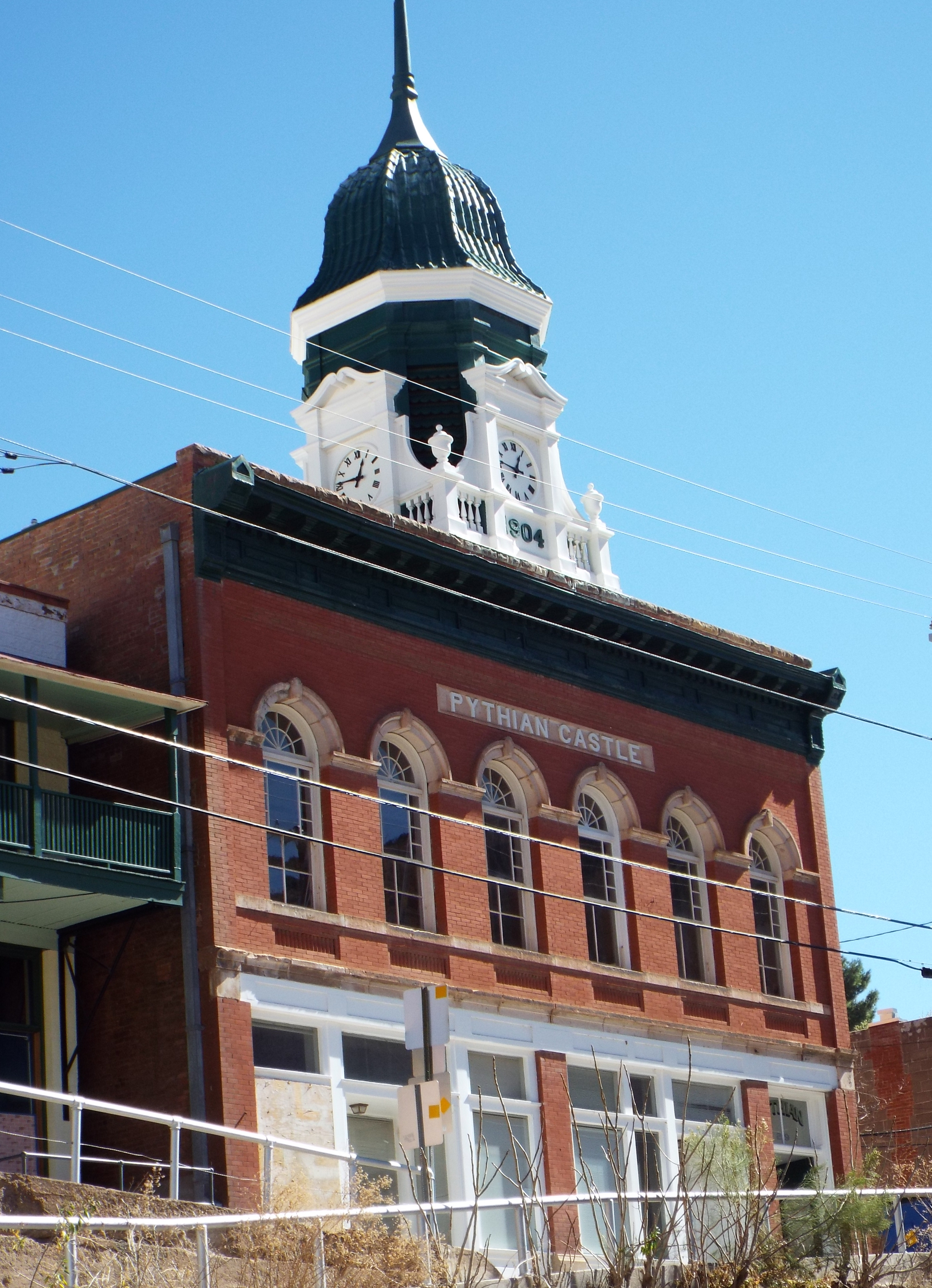
Pythian Castle

The architecture of the Historic District runs parallel to the Bisbee's economic history. There is a scarcity of buildings built post-World War I, which reflects the town's lack of growth subsequent to 1920. Most of the buildings date from 1895 to 1915, the heyday of the mining industry in Bisbee. In other towns which continued to grow, many of these buildings would have been razed and replaced with newer, larger buildings.

Remaining historic buildings can be broken into five main categories: public and semi-public facilities; commercial structures; religious, social and education facilities; lodging houses; and residential homes. The public/semi-public buildings were erected with full or partial support of the Phelps Dodge company and include, the Copper Queen Hospital, Copper Queen Hotel, YMCA, and the Copper Queen Library and Post Office. Commercial structures include the Citizens Bank and Trust, the Letson Block, the Medigovich Building II, the Muheim Block, and the Johnson Building. The religious/social/education structures include the Covenant Presbyterian Church, BPOE Building, and the Central School. Many of the buildings in these first three categories were designed by architects, the two most prominent being Henry Trost and Frederick C. Hurst. Lodging houses and residential properties include the Castle Rock Hotel, the Billy Brophy House, and the Spencer Clawson Residence.

== Contributing structures ==
Below is a table of the structures which contribute to the significance of the district. They are rated either: C (contributing); S (significant); NR (has a separate individual listing on the NRHP).

Number	Name	Rating	Address	Description	Notes
37	Commercial building	S	18 Main Street	Built 1905 along with 14 Main Street; one-story volume with three arches	
38	Phelps Dodge General Office Building	NR	5 Queen Avenue	Built 1894. listed separately in the National Register	
39	Nurses Home	C	20 Howell Avenue	Built 1904; one-story masonry structure	Originally used to house nurses employed at the Copper Queen Hospital
40	Copper Queen Hospital	C	23 Queen Avenue	Built c. 1914; Neo-Colonial influence; two-story masonry structure; small classical detailing; elaborate brickwork in facade	
109	Cunningham House	S	123 Clawson Avenue	Built pre-1906; single-story frame building, projecting bays, porch with turned posts	Built by Michael J. Cunningham, the founder of the Bank of Bisbee
112	Billy Brophy House	S	115 Clawson Avenue	Built pre-1901; 1 1/2-story frame structure with major addition, Queen Anne influences, hipped and gabled roof, with deep overhangs, octagonal porch with columns	H. Brophy, member of the Irish immigrant family which become one of Arizona's most influential families
113	Residence	C	113 Clawson Avenue	Built approx. 1910; single-story, rectangular plan with porches in front and rear	
114	Residence	C	111 Shearer Avenue	Built pre-1901; single-story frame house, gabled roof, porches with columns	
115	Residence	C	103 Shearer Avenue	Built pre-1931; slump block building with flat roof	
116	Residence	C	101 Shearer Avenue	Built pre-1901; one-story bungaloid structure, gabled roof, exposed rafters at overhangs, front porch	
117	Bisbee High School	S	104 Clawson	Built 1914; rebuilt 1920; four stories, flat-roof. decorative cornice, corner entry, rounded corners on two sides L-shaped plan	
118	Residence	C	6 Mansfield Avenue	Built 1910; single-story concrete structure, square plan with porches at front and rear	
119	Residence	C	12A Mansfield Avenue	Built 1903; single-story concrete block; rectangular plan; front and rear porches	
120	Residence	C	14 Mansfield Avenue	Built 1910; single-story; concrete block structure	
121	Residence	C	57B Anguis Avenue	Built pre-1931, Concrete block	
122	Residence	C	Anguis Avenue	Built pre-1931; single-story; rectangular plan	
123	Residence	C	57C Anguis Avenue	Built 1904, single-story, concrete block structure, irregular plan	
124	Anguis House	C	55A Anguis Avenue	Built 1908; gabled roof, front facade with articulated stickwork	Built by State Senator Anguis
125	Residence	C	53B Tack Avenue	Single-story concrete building; porch at front entry Built 1906	
126	Oliver Boarding House	C	76 Tack Avenue	Built 1910; two-story brick, hipped roof, east side veranda, central hallway	
127	Residence	C	23 Sowles Avenue	Built pre-1901; single-story adobe, front porch	
128	Residence	C	48 Howell (Shearer) Avenue	Built 1900; two-story frame, veranda	
129	St. John's Episcopal Church	S	19 Sowle Avenue	Built 1904; single-story frame church, cruciform plan, roof forms include gabled, hipped and pyramidal; eleven stained glass windows dedicated 1941.	Church built as a memorial to Phelps Dodge Chief Surgeon, Dr. F.A. Sweet.
130	Residence	C	45 Howell Avenue (Shearer Avenue)	Built c. 1892, porch extends across three sides	
130A	Garage	C	43-45 Howell Avenue	Single-story structure with corrugated metal garage doors and roofing.	
131	Residence	C	43 Howell Avenue (Shearer Avenue)	Built 1905; single-story frame, gable roof with porch.	
132	Residence	C	19 Clawson Avenue	Built 1900; single-story; porch at rear	
133	Residence	C	39A Howell Avenue (Shearer Ave.)	Original one-story adobe structure built 1911, major addition 1914	
134	Residence	C	39 Howell Avenue (Shearer Ave.)	Built pre-1908; single-story, frame, gable roof with porch	
135	Residence	C	16 Clawson Avenue	Built 1906; single-story with veranda	
136	Church of Christ	C	38A Opera Drive	Built 1905, single-story adobe, square plan	
137	Residence	C	33-37 Howell Avenue (Shearer Ave.)	Built pre-1931, single-story, gypsum block, rectangular plan	
138	Residence	C	12 Clawson Avenue	Built 1900; one-story building, front porch	
139	Residence	C	48 Opera Drive	Built 1900; single-story, porch on three sides	
140	Residence	C	31 Howell Avenue	Built 1890; two-story, adobe, veranda across three sides, frame additions, turned columns, hipped roof, originally a rooming house	
141	Residence	C	44 Opera Drive	Built 1900, single-story frame building, veranda encircling structure, hipped and gabled roof	Built by Henry M. Woods, carpenter for the Copper Queen
142	Residence	C	52 Opera Drive	Built 1889–1892; single-story, frame, gabled roof, veranda	
143	Residence	C	54 Opera Drive	Built 1914, single-story frame, gable roof	
144	Residence	C	56 Opera Drive	Built c. 1901; single-story frame structure, gable roof	
145	Social Center	C	58 Opera Drive	Built prior to 1906; two-story building of reinforced concrete, rectangular plan	
146	Residence	C	60 Opera Drive	Built 1900; two-story, concrete, square plan	
147	Taylor Residence	C	64 Opera Drive	Built 1900, square plan; second-story veranda, hipped roof of corrugated metal	Built by John S. Taylor, an early mayor; one of the earliest buildings constructed of cement block,
148	Residence	C	67 Opera Drive	Built pre-1908; two-story, with veranda on two sides	
149	Residence	C	65 Opera Drive	Built 1900; two-story, with porch	
150	Residence	C	63 Opera Drive	Built pre-1908; two stories, side porch	
151	Residence	C	61 Taylor Drive	Built 1925; one-story, side porch, rectangular plan	
152	Residence	C	57 Taylor Avenue	Built 1905; single-story adobe front and side porch	
153	Residence	C	28C Broadway	Built pre-1901, single-story adobe	
154	Residence	C	26C Broadway	Built 1901, two-story house, T plan, side porch	
155	Residence	C	22B Broadway	Built c. 1901; single-story, side porches	
156	Central School	S	47 Opera Drive	Built 1905, two stories, gypsum block, hipped roof, belfry, symmetrical plan with Italianate influence	First school constructed with bond issue money, built by local architect F.C. Hurst
157	YMCA Building	S	39 Opera Drive	Built 1905; three stories, brick, hipped roof, bracketed cornice, arched window openings arranged in pairs	Originally constructed by Phelps Dodge as an employee gymnasium
158	Residence	C	19A Howell Avenue	Built c. 1905, single-story, rectangular plan	
159	Residence	C	Howell Avenue	Built c. 1931, single-story, concrete block	
160	Covenant Presbyterian Church	S	19 Howell Avenue	Built 1903–04; single-story brick, stained glass windows, steeple, steeply pitched slate roof, dormer windows; North European Gothic Revival influence	architects Parish & Schroeder designed building following study of Dutch Reformed Churches in Holland
161	Copper Queen Hotel	S	7-13 Howell Avenue	Built 1898, Italianate influence, originally arranged around a central courtyard; extensively remodeled in 1905; four-story, brick and stucco, symmetrical plan with 44 rooms, pyramidal roofs with red tiles cover two towers, third tower was a later addition, original glass and woodwork remain	Built by the Copper Queen Company
162	Postal Telegraph Building	S	5 Howell Avenue	Built 1906; two-story, brick and stucco structure, hipped roof with red tiles, style is similar to adjacent Copper Queen Hotel	
163	Medigovich Building II	S	2-6 Brewery Gulch	Built 1902; two-story brick corner building, extended cornice, second-story windows have elliptical concrete lintels	
164	Medigovich Building I	S	8-10 Brewery Gulch	Built 1902; two-story brick commercial building; similar in style to adjacent Medigovich Building II	
165	Heating Plant Annex	C	5A Howell Avenue	Built pre-1908; single-story, concrete block structure	houses mechanical system for Copper Queen Hotel (161)
166	Brewery Gulch Hotel	C	14-16 Brewery Gulch	Built 1904; three-story brick building, arched side windows with shutters, front windows have stone heads and lugsills	
167	Bisbee Cleaners	C	18 Brewery Gulch	Built 1939; single-story, gypsum block; irregular shape wedged into lot	
168	Commercial Building	C	24 Brewery Gulch	Built 1900; two-story commercial building	
169	Commercial Building	C	26-28 Brewery Gulch	Built 1904; two-story commercial building	
170	Commercial Building	C	30-34 Brewery Gulch	Built 1906; two-story commercial building	
171	Commercial Building	C	36-38 Brewery Gulch	Built 1905; two-story commercial building	
172	Commercial Building	C	42-46 Brewery Gulch	Built pre-1931; single-story commercial building; rectangular plan	
173	Miners Hotel	C	48-50 Brewery Gulch	Built c. 1905; three-story commercial brick building	
174	City Park	C	66-72 Brewery Gulch	Built 1916; irregularly shaped paved and raised area, enclosed by ornamental iron fence with decorative street lamps	originally the Bisbee Cemetery
175	Residence	C	101 A Brewery Gulch	Built 1900; single-story adobe, with front porch	
176	Residence	C	103 B Brewery Gulch	Built 1900; single-story with porch area	
177	Residence	C	101B Brewery Gulch	Built pre-1901; single-story with porch	
178	Residence	C	71A Brewery Gulch	Built 1900; single-story with additions	
179	Commercial Building	C	65 Brewery Gulch	Built pre-1908; two-story concrete, first-story porches	
180	Lodging House	C	61-63 Brewery Gulch	Built 1898; two-story frame structure with gabled roof, veranda	
181	Residence	C	57 Brewery Gulch	Built pre-1908; two-story, front and rear porches	
182	Silver King Hotel	C	45-47 Brewery Gulch	Built c. 1907; three-story brick arched entryway	
182A	Bottling Works	C	41 Brewery Gulch	Built 1908; two-story concrete block building; ground floor windows with 20-lights	
183	Commercial Building	C	37 Brewery Gulch	Built pre-1908; two-story brick building	
184	Commercial Building	C	47A Brewery Gulch	Built pre 1931; one-story concrete building	
185	Commercial Building	C	67B Brewery Gulch	Built 1899; single-story frame building with porch	
186	Residence	C	83B OK Street	Built 1890; two-story T-shaped building, first story of stone, adobe second story	
187	Residence	C	81-83 OK Street	Built 1910; two-story concrete building	
188	Residence	C	79 OK Street	Built 1910; single-story adobe	
189	Residence	C	77 0K Street	Built pre-1901; single-story adobe, front porch	
190	Residence	C	75A 0K Street	Built c. 1901; single-story adobe with later concrete additions	
191	Residence	C	75C OK Street	Built 1906; single-story; rectangular plan, porches	
192	Residence	C	69F OK Street	Built 1916; single-story with veranda	
193	Residence	C	69E OK Street	Built 1912; single-story; rectangular plan	
194	Residence	C	69B OK Street	Built pre-1908; single-story, L-shaped plan, porch	
195	Residence	C	63C OK Street	Built 1919; single-story, porches	
196	Residence	C	63B OK Street	Built 1915; concrete block with porches	
197	Residence	C	65B OK Street	Built 1918; single-story; building with porch	
198	Residence	C	69 OK Street	Built 1910; two-story; square plan	
199	Residence	C	65 OK Street	Built 1906; single-story, front porch	
200	Residence	C	68 OK Street	Built 1906, single-story with porch	
201	Brooks Apartments	S	55 OK Street	Built 1914; three-story reinforced concrete buildings, triple veranda, arcades at first story	example of early apartments built to house miners and their families
202	Commercial	C	55 A OK Street	Built pre-1908; single-story; irregular plan, front porch	
203	Residence	C	53C OK Street	Built pre-1908; two-story concrete block building, veranda	
204	Residence	C	51B OK Street	Built 1912; single-story concrete building, front and rear porch	
205	Residence	C	51C OK Street	Built 1912; single-story concrete building, porch	
206	Residence	C	47B OK Street	Built 1916; two-story concrete building; square plan, front porch	
207	Residence	C	43B OK Street	Built 1910; two-story concrete building with porch	
208	Residence	C	39B OK Street	Built 1905; two-story concrete building with veranda	
209	Residence	C	41A OK street	Built 1908; two-story concrete structure with porch	
210	Residence	C	41B 0K Street	Built 1908; two-story concrete structure with porch	
211	Residence	C	47A OK Street	Built 1908; two-story concrete structure with porch	
212	Hotel Building	C	45 OK Street	Built 1905; two-story brick building; paired windows; recessed entryway	
213	Commercial Building	C	39-41 OK Street	Built 1919; single-story	
214	Commercial Building	C	37 OK Street	Built 1905; two-story building with front and side porches	
215	Pythian Castle	S	29-33 OK Street	Built 1904; two-story brick building; arched windows, extended cornice, octagonal clock tower with spire and finial	designed by local architect Fred Hurst; used as Knights of Pythias Lodge until 1914
216	Philadelphia Hotel	C	21 OK Street	Built 1906; two-story concrete block faced with brick, extended cornice	
217	Residence	C	21A OK Street	Built pre-1901; 1-story adobe and frame structure; low pitched gabled roof	
218	Caretto Residence	S	11B OK Street	Built 1905; 1 1/2-story block and frame house; three dormers in front pitch of broad gable roof; arched colonnade on two sides	Built by Baptisto Caretto, successful saloon keeper and contractor
219	Residence	C	7E, 7F and 7G OK Street	Ruins of three concrete residences, built 1920's	
220	Jail	S	9 OK Street	Built 1904; two-story brick structure faced with stone on first floor; stepped parapet with corbelled brickwork; barred windows; stone lugsills	
221	Commercial Building	C	9A OK Street	Built pre-1901; two-story brick structure; rectangular massing	
222	Brophy Building/OK Street	C	3-7 OK Street	Built 1905; two-story brick structure, divided into two store bays; three pairs of windows in upper portion of facade, central pediment in parapet	Designed by Fred Hurs
223	Bisbee Improvement Company	C	100-180 Naco Road	Built pre-1906; two-story structure of concrete block and cut stone; rectangular facade penetrations; irregular plan; short projecting cornice	Designed by Fred Hurst
225	City Hall	S	110-112 Naco Road	Built 1905; two-story stone and concrete building; Italianate influence	Designed by F.C. Hurst; originally housed city offices and fire department
226	Sheriff's Office and Justice Court	C	116 Naco Road	Built 1918; two-story building; Classical Revival facade featuring 4 Ionic columns, dentiled cornice and elliptical arches over second-story windows.	
227	Residence	C	7B OK Street	Built pre-1905; one-story house	
228	Residence	C	9B OK Street	Built pre-1901; small adobe structure, gable roof	
229	Residence	C	7H OK Street	Built pre-1901; small rock structure, rubble course, gable roof	
230	Residence	C	7A OK Street	Built about 1910, portions may be 19th century; 1-story frame structure	
231	Residence	C	108H Naco Road	Built about 1910; small frame structure	
232	Residence	C	112 A Naco Road	Built before 1901, additions about 1905; small frame structure	
233	Commercial Building	C	118 Naco Road	Built pre-1901, second story added after 1908; frame construction; commercial space below, lodging above; narrow rectangular plan.	
234	Jovanovich Building	S	120-122 Naco Road	Built c. 1903; two-story brick structure; hipped roof with attic gables; two-story porch structure in front facade.	
235	Commercial Building	C	124 Naco Road	Built before 1930; 1^ stories; stepped end gable	
236	Commercial Building	C	14-18 Naco Road	Built about 1910; two-story brick structure; glass and steel commercial front on ground floor; 4 pairs of double hung windows above; cast cornice	
237	Commercial Building	C	18-20 OK Street	Built about 1910; two-story brick structure	
238	Lyric Theater	C	6-10 Naco Road	Built 1912–1914; two-story brick' balcony and stage intact	Built by Nick and John Diamos, a Greek emigrant who with his relative developed a chain of Arizona Theaters
1	St. Patrick's School Classroom Building	C	225 Oak Avenue	Two-story masonry structure; rectangular plan; built about 1930	
2	Loretto Academy (St. Patricks School)	S	225 Oak Avenue	Built 1907; two-story structure, rectangular plan, hip roof; Mission Style	designed by Henry Trost; originally a boarding and day school operated by the Sisters of Loretto
3	St. Patrick's Catholic Church	S	217 Oak Avenue	Late Gothic Revival; brick structure built 1916; cruciform plan; has original stained glass;	designed by architect Albert Martin of Los Angeles
4	Courthouse Annex	C	Quality Hill Road at Oak Avenue	Built during the 1930s; two-story masonry structure; rectangular plan; Art Deco detailing	
5	Cochise County Courthouse (2nd)	S	Quality Hill Road at Oak Avenue	Built 1931; four-story with basement; Art Deco; decorative motif based on stylized native cacti; symmetrical rectangular plan, concrete structure; elaborate entry with copper doors	Designed by Tucson architect Roy Place
6	Restaurant	C	202 Upper Main Street	Built about 1930 as a Lodging house; one-story, rectangular plan	
7	Gas Station Building	C	200 Upper Main Street	Built in 1921; frame structure; "Lu - shaped plan consists of rectangular garage and office with projecting canopy over pumps; has been modified.	
8	Residence	C	146 Upper Main Street	Built pre-1905; one-story frame cottage with medium pitch gable roof	
9	Residence	C	142 Upper Main Street	Built pre-1898; one-story board and batten cottage, hip roof with attic gable; interior core of adobe	
10	Residence	C	140 Upper Main Street	Built c. 1905; one-story frame cottage, rectangular plan, medium itch gable roof parallel to road; continuous front porch	
11	Residence	C	136 Upper Main Street	Built c. 1900; one-story frame cottage, L-shaped plan; intersecting gable roofs; porch with small ornamental detailing, triangular dormer	
12	Residence	C	134 Upper Main Street	Built pre-1905; one-story frame cottage; gable roofs	
13	Residence	C	130 Upper Main Street	Built c. 1905; one-story frame cottage; medium pitch gable roof parallel to road; continuous front porch with balustrade	
14	Residence	C	126 Upper Main Street	Built c. 1905; one-story frame cottage with adobe core	
15	Residence	C	118 Upper Main Street	Built pre-1905; one-story frame cottage; medium pitch gable roof; continuous front porch; basic plan is rectangular	
16	Residence	C	114 Upper Main Street	Built c. 1906; one-story frame cottage, gable roofs; irregular plan	
17	Castle Rock Hotel	S	112 Upper Main Street	Built c. 1895; two-story frame structure; longitudinal center hall; hipped roof; three-sided veranda; wood detailing derived from Victorian Italianate	
18	Lodging House	C	108 Upper Main Street	Built 1910's; two-story frame lodging house	
19	Residence	C	102 Upper Main Street	Built before 1930; one-story frame cottage	
20	Baptist Church	C	94 Main Street	Built c. 1918; Mission Style; rectangular plan with flanking towers; major addition to west side in 1948	
21	Commercial Building	C	92-83 Main Street	Built pre-1930; one-story brick structure, modified facade	
22	Commercial Building	C	86-84 Main Street	Built pre-1930; one-story structure, modified facade	
23	Commercial Building	C	82-80 Main Street	Built pre-1930; two-story brick structure; modified facade	
24	Commercial Building	C	78-72 Main Street	Built pre-1930; one-story brick structure; modified facade	
25	KLM Building (Golden Hotel)	C	54-40 Main Street	Built c. 1910; concrete structure with brick facade; pedimented parapet	First floor for commercial uses, second for lodging
26	Anguis Building (J.C. Penney, Co.)	C	38-36 Main Street	Built c. 1909; two stories, brick structure; glass facade; applied plaster consoles and cartouches show Neo-Classical Revival influence; stepped parapet	
27	Commercial Building	C	32 Main Street	Built 1904; narrow one-story brick structure; very similar in design and ornamentation to the Anguis Building (#26)	
28	Commercial Building	C	30 Main Street	Built 1904; two-story brick structure; rectangular plan, symmetrical facade with pair of second-story windows, glass block panels, display windows with recessed entry, bracketed cornice	
29	Moose Hall	C	28 Main Street	Built 1904; two-story brick structure; symmetrical facade with band of three windows in upper story, cornice with pairs of oversize consoles; inset panel of glass bricks, display windows with recessed entry, original copper moulding, windows, thick beveled brass rail interior staircase	
30	Letson Block	S	20 Main Street	Built 1902; oriel windows, projecting cornice with brackets; articulated brickwork in facade; cast iron columns; original street front intact	Best example of late Victorian commercial block in Bisbee
31	Commercial Building	C	22-20 Main Street	Built 1904; pair of oriel windows, corbelled stringcourse in brick facade; flat parapet line	
32	Office Bar, Orient Realty and Trading Co.	S	14 Main Street	Built 1905; white oak carved mouldings, asymmetrical facade of rough cut stone in broken courses; south side: two-story volume with rectangular openings	Originally a men's club known as "The Office"
33	Bisbee Review Building	S	12 Main Street	Built 1905; two-story brick structure; symmetrical facade; cornice with heavy brackets, and cressets of contrasting material	Originally used as clinic and pharmacy by Copper Queen doctors
34	Copper Queen Library and Post Office	S	8-6 Main Street	Built 1906; designed by architect Fred Hurst; three-story structure of concrete and gypsum block; exterior arcade on two sides behind arched facade; small classical details	
35	Phelps Dodge Mercantile	C	Queen Avenue	Built 1939; two-story concrete structure; Streamline Moderne style; rounded corners; banded windows	Erected by Del Webb who later developed Sun City
41	YWCA Building	S	28 Howell Avenue	Built 1915; four stories with basement; brick; concrete structure; bracketed cornice and hoods on front elevation; Neo-Colonial influence	Endowed by Grace Dodge
42	Allen Building	C	27 Subway Alley	Built c. 1908; two-story block structure; recessed sidewalk arcade along Shearer Avenue; corner entry at Subway and Shearer; with shop window	
43	Commercial Building	C	29-31 Subway Alley	Built 1910; one-story structure, two store fronts	
44	I.O.O.F. Building	S	33-35 Subway Alley	Built 1918; front - three-story; back - one-story; recessed shop entry on south and lodge entry on north; central pediment and cornice with paired brackets; stories marked by belt courses	
45	Apartment Building	C	37-41 Subway Alley	Built 1910; two-story masonry structure	
46	Storage Building	C	43 Subway Alley	Built c. 1905; one-story	
47	Commercial Building	C	45 Subway Alley	Built pre-1906; one-story	
48	Bank of Bisbee	S	1 Main Street	Built 1904–1906; Second Renaissance Revival style; two-story brick and concrete structure	Founded by W.H. Brophy, J.S. Douglas, and M.J. Cunningham
49	Antlers Building	C	3-5 Main Street	Built c. 1906; designed by Fred Hurst; two-story brick building; bracketed cornice; decorative brickwork; 2 recessed store fronts at street level	
50	Miners and Merchants Bank	S	7-11 Main Street	Built 1904, major addition and remodeling, pre-1930; good example of Neo-Classical Revival	Bank founded by Lem Shattuck and Joseph Muheim
51	Commercial Building	C	13 Main Street	One-story masonry structure; plaster; glass facade with recessed entry; devoid of ornament; dentist office	
52	Commercial Building	C	15 Main Street	Built c. 1906; one-story wood-frame structure; plaster and glass facade with recessed entry; devoid of ornamentation	No wood-frame buildings built since 1910 due to ban by city ordinance
53	Citizens Bank and Trust	S	21 Main Street	Built 1910; one-story concrete block building; facade features large arch over a recessed entry and plate glass window; central cartouche; Sullivanesque influence	Designed by Henry Trost
54	Brophy Main Street Building	C	23-25 Main Street	Built 1910; one-story brick structure, with recessed entryways and flat roof with low parapet	
55	Royal Theater	C	27 Main Street	Built 1910; one-story brick building with recessed entry and marquee	
56	Costello Building I	S	31-33 Main Street	Built 1907; three-story brick building with a pediment and extended cornice; similar in style to the adjacent Henniger-Johnson Building	Designed by Henry Trost
57	Henninger-Johnson Building	S	35 Main Street	Built 1907; three-story brick building with basement; extended cornice and central pediment; front facade consists of threebays; arched central bay features decorative window spandrels	Designed by Henry Trost
58	Fair Store	S	37 Main Street	Built 1907–1909. Three-story brick building; Front facade consists of three bays; second-story windows are paired and surmounted by concave semicircular shell motifs', Third floor window is arched and decorated w/metal railing	
59	Commercial Building	C	41 Main St. and Subway Alley	Built c. 1906. Two-story brick building with recessed entry; paired second-story windows capped with arched radiating voussoirs	
60	Fair Store Annex	C	57 Subway Alley	Built 1915. Two-story brick building on a polygonal plan to fit irregular lot} Street facade features cornice with brackets joined by garlands	
61	Warner Hotel	C	57H Subway Alley	Built c. 1908; two-story structure constructed of gypsum block and stone	
62	Jack Building	C	45-51 Main Street and 65 Subway Alley	Built c. 1931; one-story brick structure; corner entry consists of recessed double arches	
63	Costello Building II	C	53-55 Upper Main Street	Built 1909; two-story brick building, bracketed cornice, windows on front facade arranged in triplets	
64	Johnson Building	C	57-65 Main Street	Built 1909; two-story concrete building faced with brick, five-bay facade, central bay is recessed and pedimented	Designed by local architect F.C. Hurst
65	B.P.O.E. Building	S	61 Main Street	Built 1910; two-story brick building; classical revival influence; bracketed cornice, arched second-story windows with French doors; metal balconies	Designed by F.C. Hurst
66	Bisbee Exchange	C	69-77 Main Street	Built c. 1910; three-story brick building; three bays, central bay has arched windows; recessed entry	
67	Building - Parking Garage	C	85 Main Street	Built c. 1901; this multi-storied concrete structure is screened from Main Street by the earlier commercial blocks	
68	Masonic Temple	C	87-91 Main Street	Built 1910; three-story concrete building; front facade finished with brick and plaster facing, cartouches, ornamental entry gate	Designed by local architect F.C. Hurst
69	Building-Commercial	C	93 Main Street	Built c. 1931; single-story concrete structure	
70	Building-Commercial	C	93 1/2 Main Street	One-story frame structure, gabled roof	
71	Building-Commercial	C	95 Main Street	Single-story structure with parapet; entry with double doors	
72	Residence	C	103-105 Main Street	Built c. 1931; single-story building, gypsum block construction	
73	Double Residence	C	105A-105B Upper Main Street	Two-story frame structure three sided veranda with railing and turned wooden posts; gabled roof; built before 1930	
74	Residence	C	93A Main Street	Built pre-1930; one-story, rectangular plan	
75	Residence	C	79A Main Street	Built c. 1916; one-story structure of gypsum block; rectangular plan; porch on 2 sides	
76	Residence	C	79B-1-2 Main Street	Built c. 1916; one-story concrete block structure; rectangular plan; porch on 2 sides	
77	Residence	C	79C Main Street	Built c. 1908; one-story concrete block structure; irregular plan; corner porch with entry	
78	Residence	C	81B Main Street	Built 1908; one-story concrete block structure; irregular plan; corner porch with entry	
79	Residence	C	81C-1-2 Main Street	Built c. 1908; one-story concrete block structure; rectangular plan includes veranda on 3 sides	
80	Residence	C	A-20-B Mansfield	Built c. 1915; one-story structure; rectangular plan includes porch on NE corner	
81	Residence	C	17 Mansfield Avenue	Built pre-1930; one-story structure of gypsum block; rectangular plan with front and rear porches	
82	Residence	C	15 Mansfield Avenue	Built pre-1930; one-story structure with basement; concrete block; irregular plan; front porch on south	
83	Residence	C	20 Mansfield Avenue	Built pre-1930; two-story frame structure; hipped roof with cross center gable, first-story porch with railings	
84	Residence	C	18A Mansfield Avenue	Built pre-1930; 1 1/2-story structure; may be adobe; rectangular plan; front porch	
85	Residence	C	16 Mansfield Avenue	Built c. 1910; rectangular plan with corner porch, additions to rear; one-story structure of concrete block	
86	Residence	C	13 Mansfield Avenue	Built c. 1908; one-story structure of concrete block; irregular plan	
87	Residence	C	134 Mansfield Avenue	Built c. 1916; one-story concrete block structure with verandas on 3 sides	
88	Residence	C	138 Mansfield Avenue	Built before 1907; small one-story structure	
89	Residence	C	Clawson Hill behind 116 Clawson Avenue	Built before 1907; small one-story structure	
90	Residence	C	11 Mansfield Avenue	Built about 1915; concrete block structure, one-story irregular plan; Neo-Classical Revival porch	
91	Residence	C	5 Mansfield Avenue	Built 1901; one-story frame structure; irregular plan; corner porch on east	
92	Residence	C	114 Clawson Avenue	Built about 1920; rectangular plan, three stories on one side, and two stories on other side	
93	Spencer Clawson Residence	S	116 Clawson Avenue	Built c. 1895–6; originally a one-story frame structure with three sided porch; gabled second story added in 1920's; many interior features intact	Built for Copper Queen Mine Manager Spencer W. Clawson
94	Residence	C	103 Upper Main Street	Built c. 1906; single-story frame house; hipped roof	
95	Residence	C	123 Upper Main Street	Built c. 1905; single-story frame house, gabled roof, exterior of board and batten	
96	Residence	C	127 Upper Main Street	Built pre-1906; single-story; porch along two sides	
97	Residence	C	127 A Upper Main Street	Built pre-1931; single-story, rectangular plan	
98	Residence	C	131 A Upper Main Street	Built pre-1906; two-story, frame, hipped roof, two-story veranda	
99	Residence	C	129 Upper Main Street	Built pre-1906; single-story frame structure, gabled roof, broad porch, multiple doors, elongated plan, one-room deep	
100	Residence	C	133 Upper Main Street	Built pre-1906; single-story frame, L-shaped plan	
101	Residence	C	135 Upper Main Street	Built pre-1906; single-story frame, front porch	
102	Residence	C	139 Upper Main Street	Built pre-1906; single-story, frame, square plan, with additions	
103	Residence	C	143 Upper Main Street	Built pre-1931; single-story, rectangular plan, siting is flush with street	
104	Residence	C	139 Clawson Avenue	Built pre-1906; single-story, T-shape plan	
105	Residence	C	139A Clawson Avenue	Built pre-1906; single-story with additions, constructed on sloping site	
106	Residence	C	131 Clawson Avenue	Built pre-1906; single-story frame structure, gabled roof	
107	Residence	C	129A Clawson Avenue	Built pre-1910; single-story structure, gabled roof, front porch over entryway	
108	Tippetts House	C	127 Clawson Avenue	Built pre-1906; single-story frame building, roof both hipped and gabled, porch area on two sides, basic square plan with projecting bay.	
239	Miners Store	C	2-4 Naco Road	Built about 1901; two-story brick structure, irregular plan; front facade covered with metal siding	
240	Dixie Garage	C	7 Brewery Gulch	Built about 1907, two-story volume; irregular plan.	Built as the Orpheum Theater, converted to a garage by 1930
241	Muheim Block	S	13-17 Brewery Gulch	Built 1905; Victorian Italianate influence in commercial brick structure, exterior substantially intact	Built to house the Bisbee Stock Exchange; a major local landmark.

== See also ==
- Bisbee Residential Historic District
