= Frederick C. Hurst =

Canadian-born American architect (1864–1923)

- Born: Frederick Charles Hurst; March 2, 1864; Toronto, Canada West
- Died: September 22, 1923 (aged 59); Phoenix, Arizona, U.S.
- Occupation: Architect
- Practice: Copper Queen Consolidated Mining Company; Perkins, Holden and Hurst
- Buildings: Bisbee Woman's Club Clubhouse (1902); Copper Queen Library and Post Office (1906–07); Central School, Bisbee (1905)

Frederick Charles Hurst (March 2, 1864 – September 22, 1923) was a Canadian-born American architect who designed many of the landmark civic and commercial buildings of Bisbee, Arizona, in the first decade of the 20th century. Several of his buildings are listed on the National Register of Historic Places individually or as contributing buildings in the Bisbee Historic District.

== Early life ==
Hurst was born in Toronto on March 2, 1864, the son of Thomas Hurst, a native of Ireland, and Emma (Watts) Hurst, a native of Jersey. According to his death certificate, he had lived in the United States for 39 years at the time of his death, which would place his arrival around 1884. Some sources give his year of birth as 1856. He married Eva Hurst, whose brother lived in Winnipeg; the couple spent several weeks visiting relatives there in 1906, and the Bisbee Daily Review described Winnipeg as their "former home".

== Career ==
=== Bisbee ===
Hurst came to Bisbee from Canada in 1902 to work as an engineer and architect for Phelps Dodge and its Copper Queen mining company. In that role he designed the Bisbee Woman's Club (1902), an Arts and Crafts bungalow; the Colonial Revival Copper Queen Hospital (1902); and the Renaissance Revival Central School (1905).

The Copper Queen Library and Post Office, built in 1906 and first occupied in April 1907, is also attributed to him.

In 1906 Hurst joined two other architects to form the firm of Perkins, Holden and Hurst. Within a few years the firm had drawn designs for fourteen buildings in downtown Bisbee, including the Old City Hall, the Fair Store, the Orpheum Theater, the fire station and the Elks Lodge, as well as a number of private residences. A 1906 advertisement in the Bisbee Daily Review listed "F. C. Hurst, Architect" with an office in the Muheim Block. He was associated with the El Paso architect Henry C. Trost on a design for a Bisbee opera house.

=== Phoenix and Los Angeles ===
By 1913 Hurst was advertising as an architect in Phoenix, at 127 North Center Street. At the time of his death he was building inspector for the city of Phoenix.

== Death ==
Hurst was struck by an automobile on First Street in downtown Phoenix, between Washington and Jefferson streets, and died at St. Joseph's Hospital in Phoenix on September 22, 1923. The driver was charged with manslaughter.

== Works ==
All in Bisbee, Arizona, unless noted.

- Bisbee Woman's Club Clubhouse (1902), NRHP-listed
- Copper Queen Hospital (1902)
- Central School (1905)
- Copper Queen Library and Post Office (1906–1907)
- With Perkins, Holden and Hurst: Old City Hall, the fire station, the Fair Store, the Orpheum Theater, and the Elks Lodge
