= Bisbee Woman's Club Clubhouse =

Historic clubhouse in Bisbee, Arizona

- U.S. National Register of Historic Places
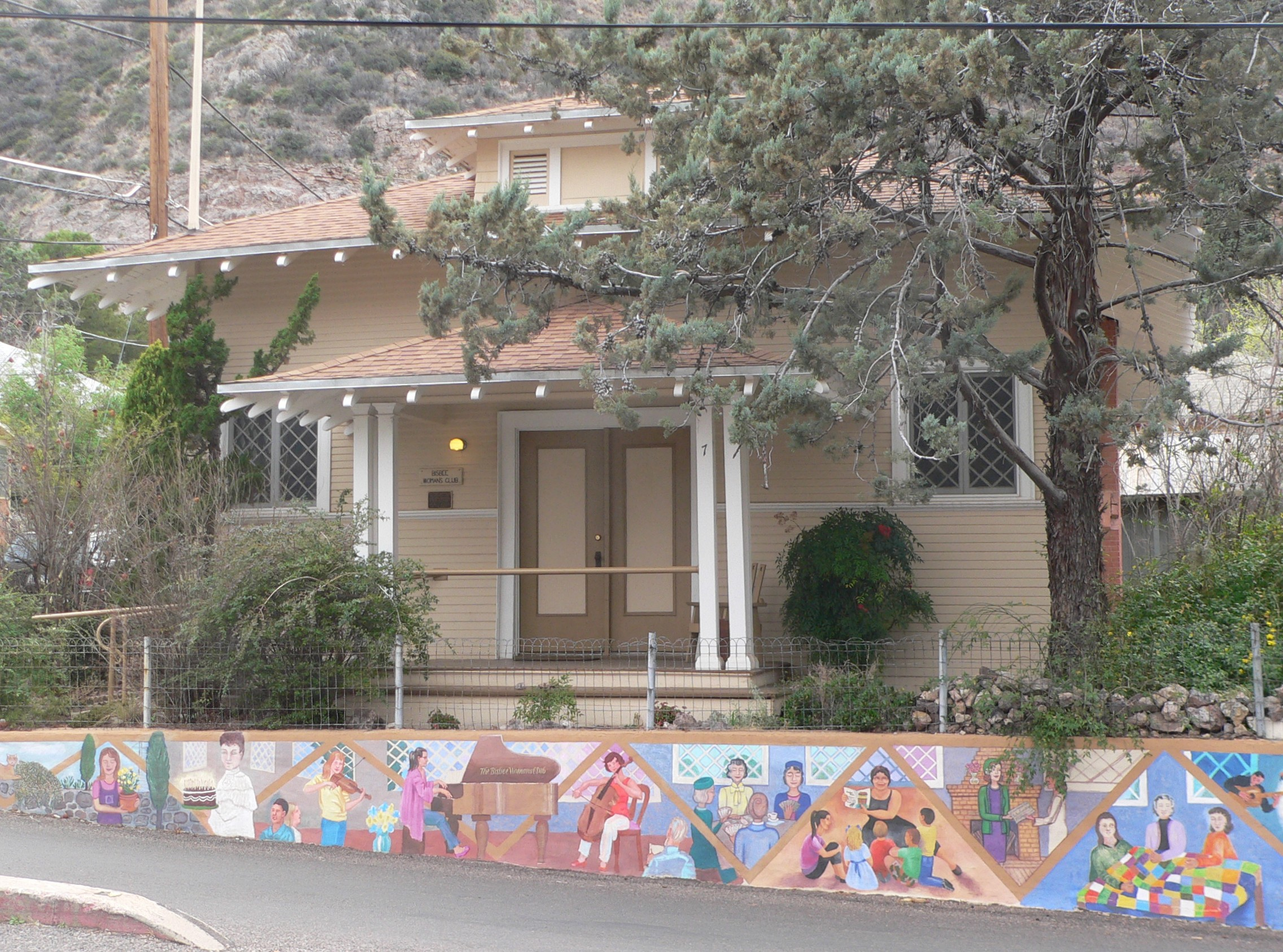

- Location within Arizona Location within the United States
- Location: 74 Quality Hill, Bisbee, Arizona
- Coordinates: 31.442354°N 109.919876°W
- Built: 1902
- Architect: Frederick C. Hurst
- Architectural style: Bungalow/craftsman, Vernacular Craftsman Style
- NRHP reference No.: 85000145
- Added to NRHP: January 31, 1985

The Bisbee Woman's Club Clubhouse in Bisbee, Arizona was built in 1902 for the Bisbee Woman's Club. It was listed on the National Register of Historic Places in 1985. The clubhouse was designed by architect Frederick C. Hurst. It is a one-story frame building, a vernacular interpretation of the Craftsman style. The National Register nomination calls it the oldest continually used women's clubhouse in Arizona.

== History ==
In the years around 1900, Bisbee was a copper-mining town built around the Copper Queen Mine of Phelps Dodge. It had few social or educational amenities. The wives of mining company officials and local merchants formed small sewing and reading clubs. On October 24, 1900, a town-wide Woman's Club was organized with 21 charter members. The club met at various places, including the Copper Queen Library and the Copper Queen Hotel.

Finding these meeting places inadequate, and troubled by the noise of the town, the club raised funds for a clubhouse of its own and obtained land on Quality Hill. The architect was Frederick C. Hurst, who was then working as structural engineer for Phelps Dodge. In that job he also designed the Copper Queen Hospital, the Central School and the Copper Queen Library. The clubhouse was completed in October 1902 at a cost of $2,805.95. The nomination suggests that Hurst chose a residential design to match the houses he had designed nearby on Quality Hill.

The club's first major civic project was a kindergarten, and it persuaded the town to include a kindergarten room in plans for a new school. Members also took on the cleaning and upkeep of the crowded city jail. The clubhouse was used for card clubs, costume parties, dancing and Spanish classes, musicals, bazaars and public dances. During World War I members made and packed wound dressings. In the 1920s the club joined other Arizona women's clubs in collecting historical documents for the Pioneers Library in Tucson, and in the early 1940s it took part in wartime drives. According to the nomination, no other women's club in the territory owned a clubhouse when this one was built.

== Architecture ==
The clubhouse stands at the corner of Ledge and Cross avenues on Quality Hill. It is a one-story frame building with narrow clapboard siding and a low-pitched hipped roof, which give it a horizontal look. The north front has three bays: a central wooden portico flanked by sets of diamond-paned casement windows, which sit high in the wall on a sill molding that runs around the building. The portico rests on two groups of three square Tuscan columns. It has a low hipped roof with broad eaves and exposed, shaped rafter ends. The same rafter detail appears on all sides and on two hipped dormers, one over the entrance and one on the east side. Each side wall has six pairs of diamond-paned casements.

Inside, a central hall is flanked by a small office and a storage room and leads through double doors into the main meeting room. At one end of the room is a small stage framed by Tuscan pilasters matching the portico columns. A large brick fireplace with corbelled piers and a tapered exposed chimney stands on the east wall.

The building has had few changes. Rolled roofing was laid over the original wood shingles in 1949, and a small kitchen addition (8 by 17 ft (2.4 by 5.2 m)) was built at the rear in 1951. Inside, an oak floor replaced the original wood floor in 1942, and suspended ceilings were installed in 1949. The original doors, frames, chair rail, baseboards and picture molding survive.

== Current use ==
The Bisbee Woman's Club still owns and uses the clubhouse. It gives the address as 7 Ledge Avenue and describes the building as the oldest continually used women's club building in Arizona. The club's annual Home Tour and Art Auction, held the Friday and Saturday after Thanksgiving, raises money for scholarships, community grants and upkeep of the clubhouse.
