= Ciénega Creek =

Intermittent stream in southern Arizona

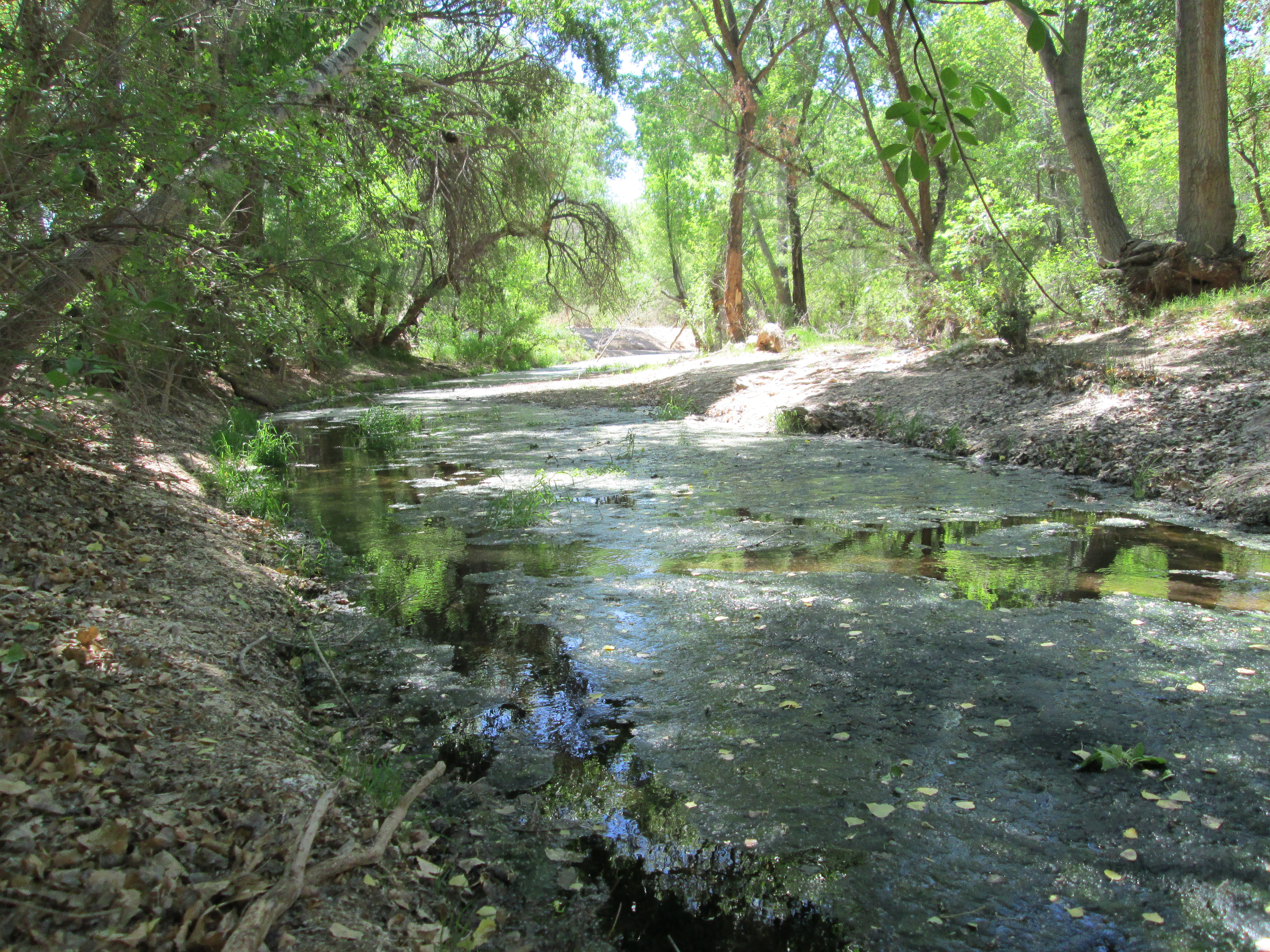
- A murky section of the creek

- Location of the mouth of Ciénega Creek in Arizona

Location
- Country: United States
- Location: Arizona

Physical characteristics
- Source
  - location: Canelo Hills
- Mouth
  - location: Rillito River
  - coordinates: 32°02′03″N 110°40′32″W
  - elevation: 3,212 ft (979 m)

Ciénega Creek (English: "Hundred Springs Creek" or "Marsh Creek") is an intermittent stream located in the Basin and Range region of southern Arizona, and is one of the most intact riparian corridors left in the state. It originates in the Canelo Hills and continues northwest about 50 miles (80 km) to an area just outside Tucson, where it becomes known as Pantano Wash. Pantano Wash continues through Tucson and eventually connects with the Rillito River.

== Course ==
From its origin in the Canelo Hills of Santa Cruz County at 31°35′24″N 110°38′44″W, Ciénega Creek flows northwesterly through the upper Ciénega basin, a wide alluvial valley separating the northern Santa Rita and Empire Mountains to the west and the Whetstone Mountains to the east. A bedrock high, called "the Narrows," serves as a hydrologic barrier dividing the upper and lower basins, and is characterized by riparian vegetation and perennial flow.

Ciénega Creek continues northward through the lower alluvial basin until it bends west/northwest in the vicinity of Anderson and Wakefield Canyons. After crossing Interstate 10 near the town of Vail, Ciénega Creek again crosses a bedrock high, and once more the flow becomes perennial. In these stretches, groundwater is forced upward through faults in the bedrock from aquifers near the surface. Just north of Vail, Ciénega Creek becomes known as Pantano Wash, which continues northwest through Tucson and links up with the Rillito River.

== Flora and fauna ==
Ciénega Creek is located within the transitional zone between the Sonoran and Chihuahuan Deserts, and exhibits some features of each region. The creek supports "outstanding examples" of cottonwood-willow gallery forest and mesquite bosque, which are home to many bird species that have become rare due to the loss of riparian habitats. Some of the birds that live along the creek are the Southwestern willow flycatcher, Yellow-billed cuckoo, and Bell's vireo.

Important lowland populations of riparian and xeroriparian amphibians and reptiles are also known to live along the creek. Included in this group are several toads, the checkered garter snake, the Madrean alligator lizard, and the giant spotted whiptail lizard. The Mexican garter snake, which has declined throughout its range in the United States, retains a strong population in Ciénega Creek.

The federally endangered Chiricahua leopard frog occurs only in the upper reaches of the creek. The lowland leopard frog and the Sonoran mud turtle inhabit the stream throughout, rounding a full complement of aquatic, native vertebrate species originally inhabiting the ciénegas of southern Arizona. An unstudied molluscan fauna also lives in the stream.

Ciénega Creek is one of the few remaining streams in southern Arizona that has not been invaded by non-native fish. Las Cienegas National Conservation Area supports the largest natural population of the federally endangered Gila topminnow in the United States, as well as a healthy population of endangered Gila chub and the longfin dace.

== Conservation ==
Las Cienegas National Conservation Area was established in 2000 to protect the upper Ciénega basin. Its headquarters is the historic Empire Ranch, which is located about 45 miles (72 km) southeast of Tucson, near the town of Sonoita. Spanning 45,000 acres (18,000 ha), Las Cienegas includes large areas of grassland and woodland, in addition to Ciénega Creek and the riparian corridor. Empire Ranch, which dates back to the 1870s, is also open to the public, and has been listed on the National Historic Register since 1976.

The Ciénega Creek Natural Preserve was founded in 1986 and is about 20 miles (32 km) north of Empire Ranch, in the lower Ciénega basin. With 4,000 acres (1,600 ha) in total, the Ciénega Creek Natural Preserve protects over 12 miles (19 km) of the creek, about half of which has perennial flow. There are also a few historic sites located in the preserve, including the ghost town of Pantano and the Ciénega Bridge, which was built between 1920 and 1921.

In Tucson, much of the Pantano Wash is now part of the Pantano River Park, which includes a paved walkway alongside the wash, as well as restrooms, water fountains, and picnic tables. The Pantano River Park is also home to a Commemorative Tree Park, which will help restore about two miles of riverbank, control floods, erosion and stormwater runoff reduction, carbon sequestration, urban heat, and provide shade. Since 2012, over 100 desert-adapted commemorative trees have been planted along the eastern banks of Pantano Wash. Hundreds more will be added over the following years, until the goal of 570 trees is reached.

== Gallery ==
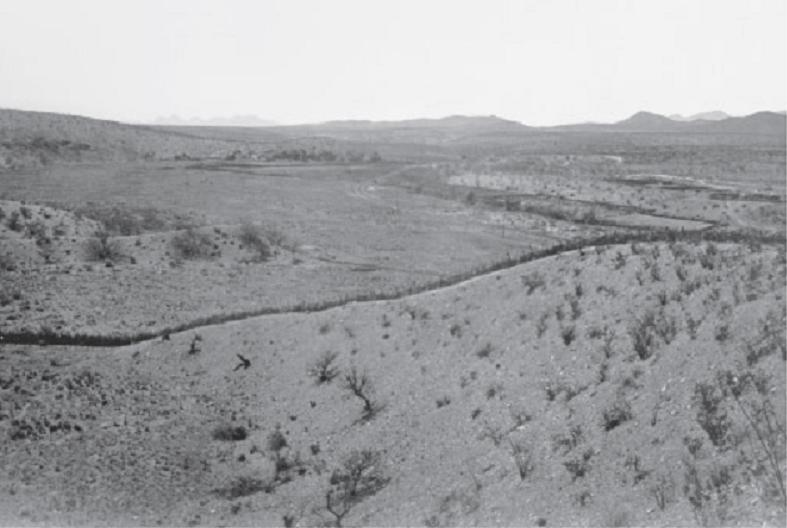
Ciénega Creek in 1880

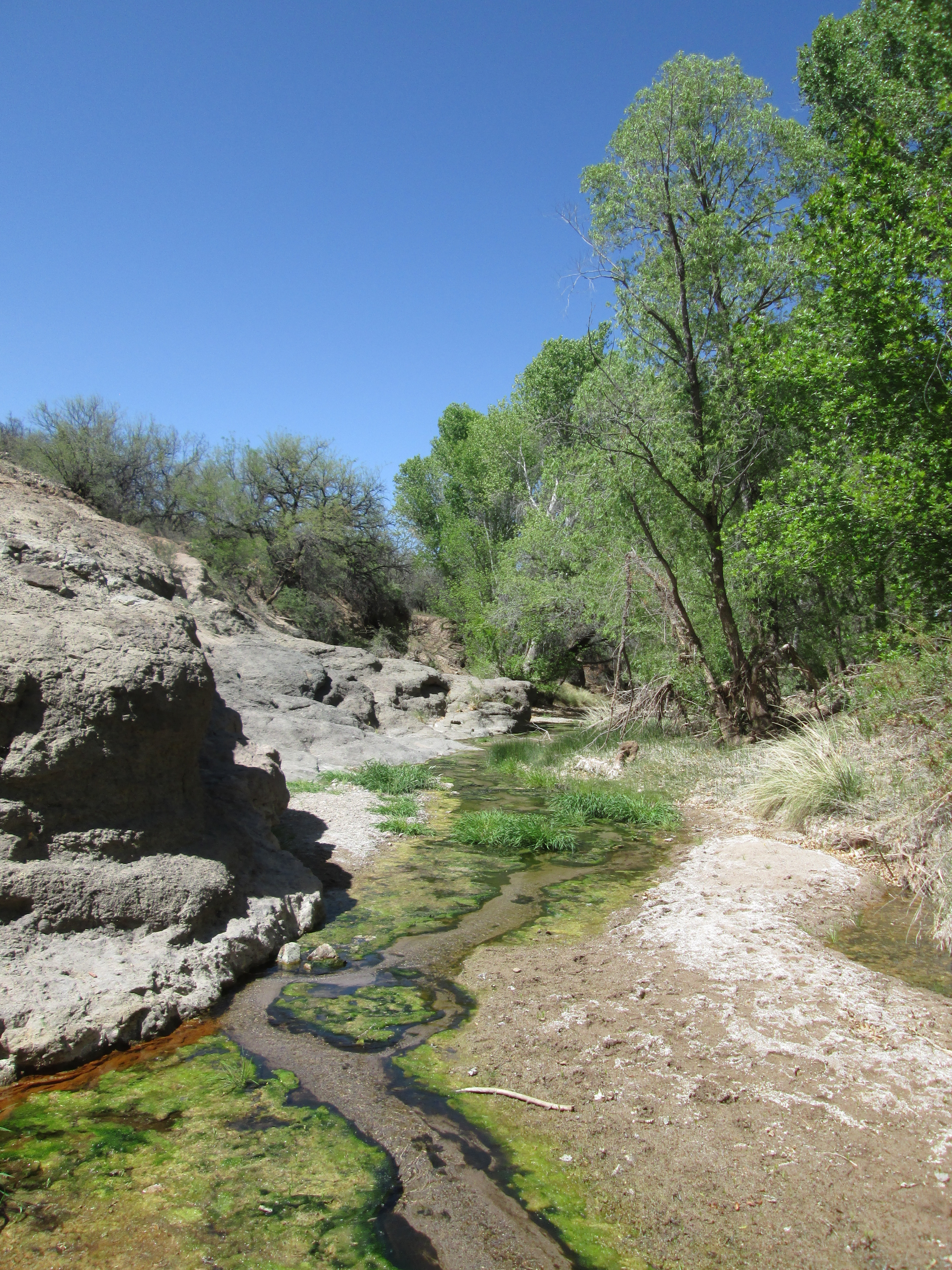
View of Ciénega Creek, at the Ciénega Creek Natural Preserve

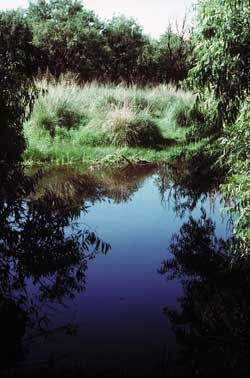
View of Ciénega Creek, in the Las Cienegas National Conservation Area

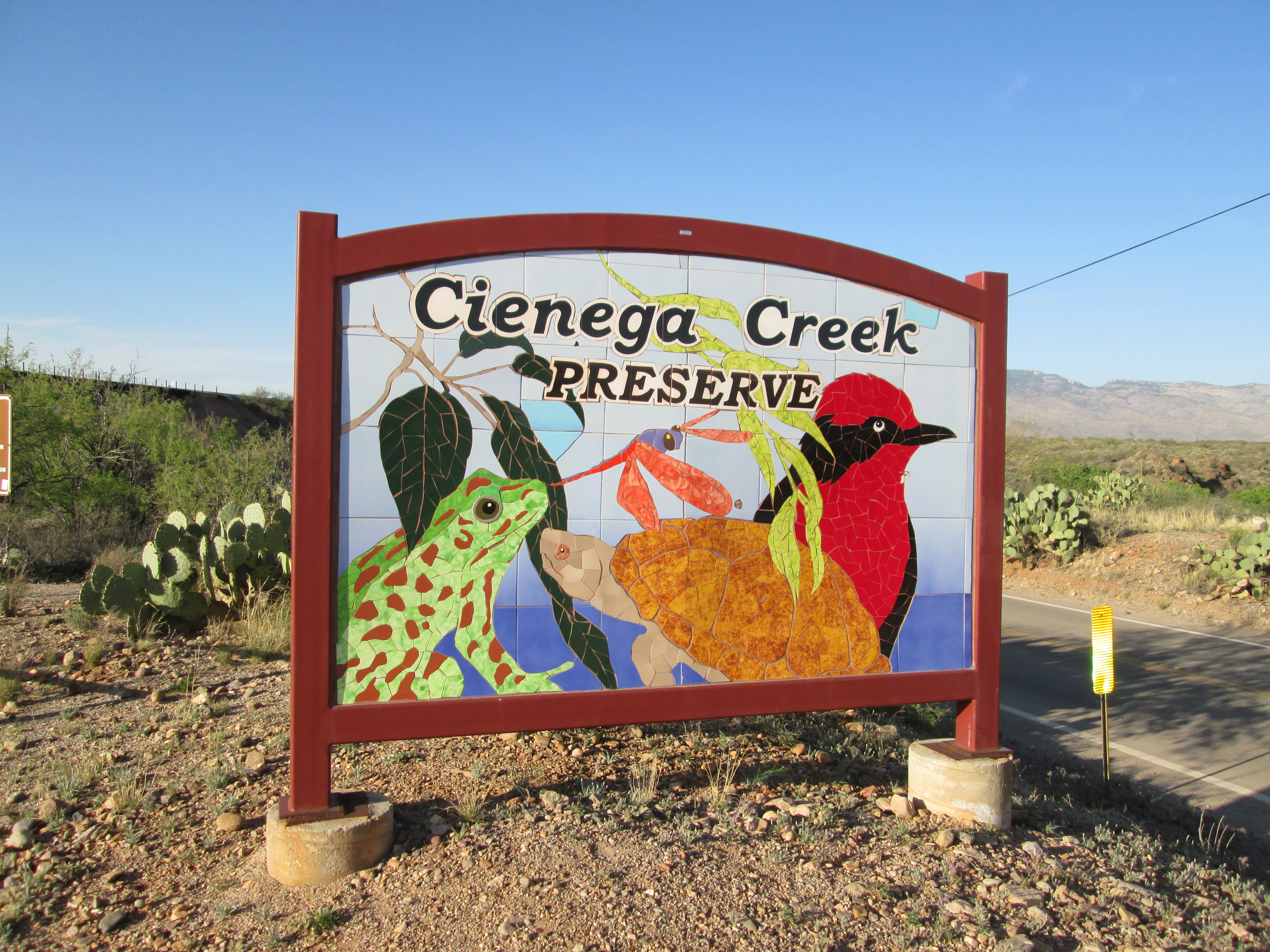
The sign at the entrance to the Ciénega Creek Natural Preserve

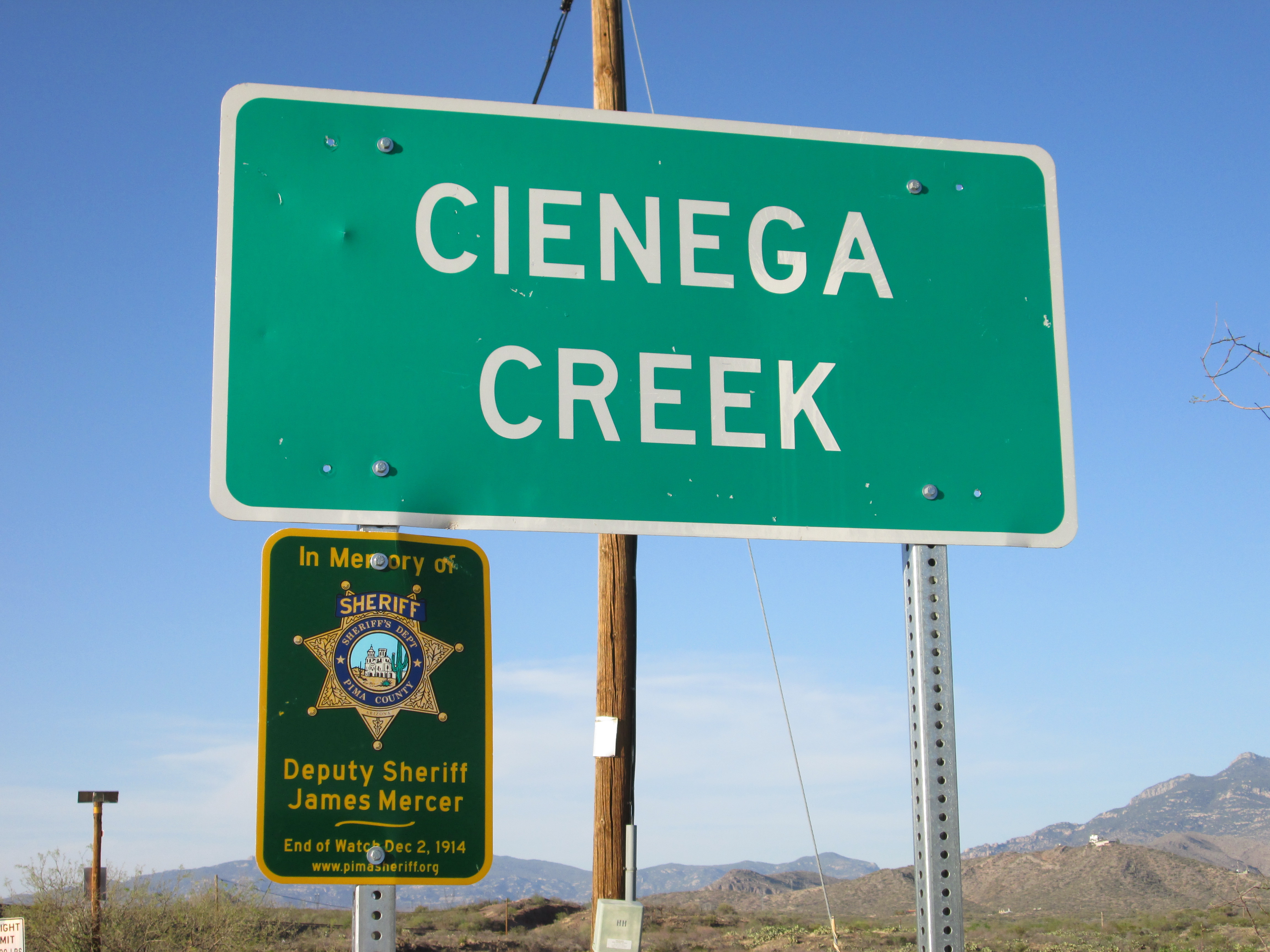
Signs at the Ciénega Creek Natural Preserve, including a memorial for Jimmie Mercer, who was ambushed by a cattle rustler near Pantano in 1914

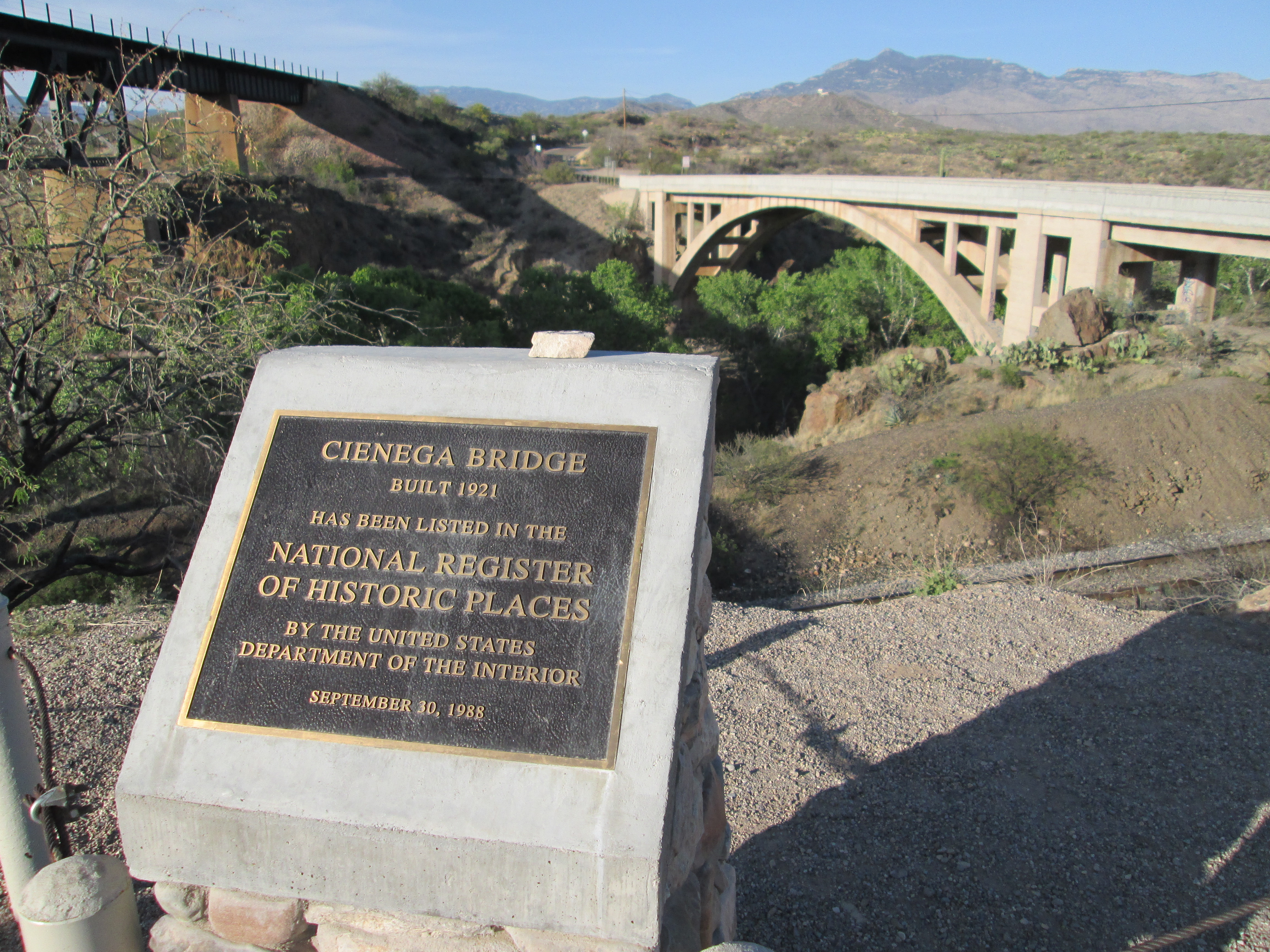
A historical marker for the Ciénega Bridge at the Ciénega Creek Natural Preserve, with the bridge in the background

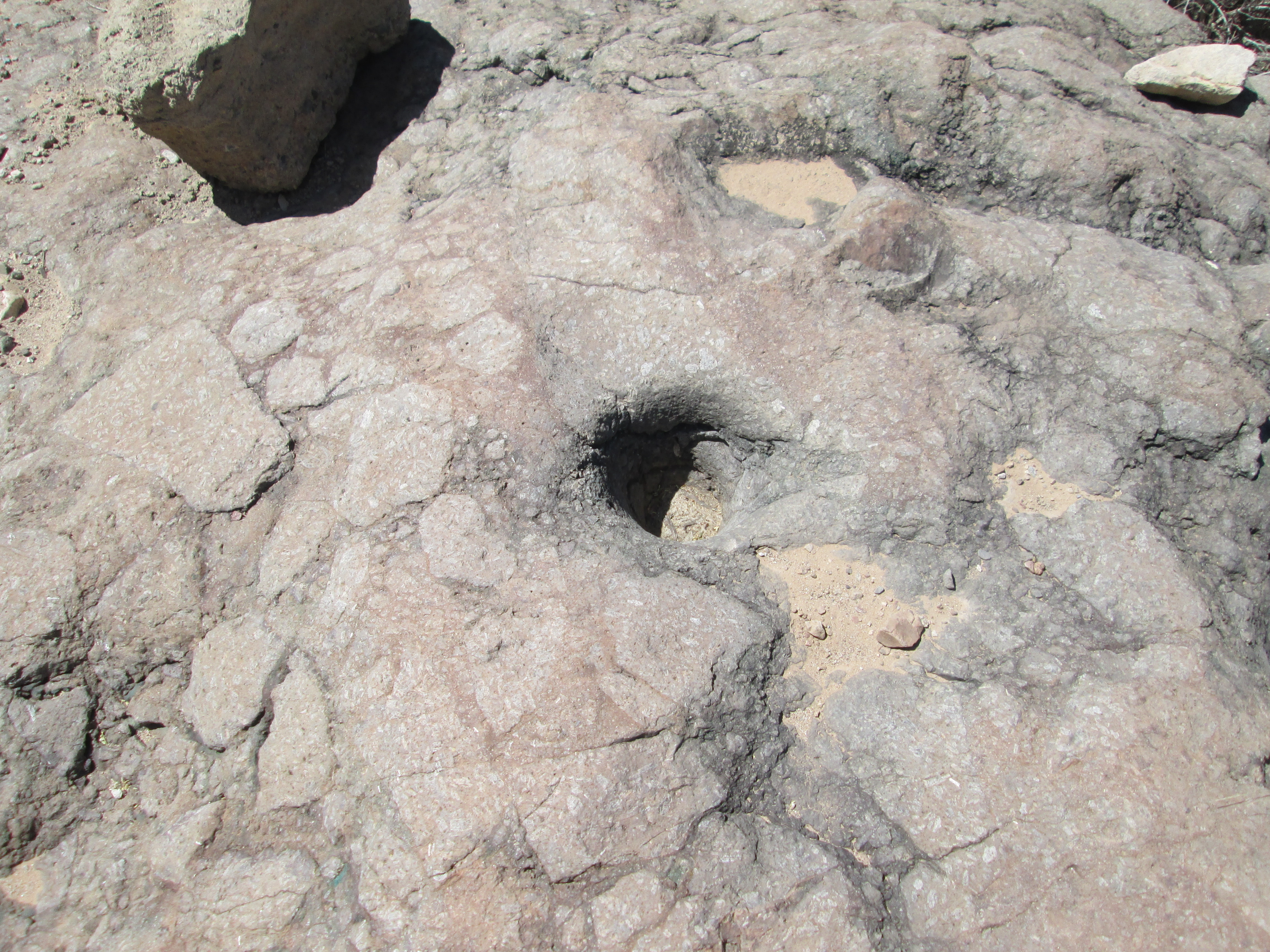
Hohokam bedrock mortar in Davidson Canyon, near its confluence with Ciénega Creek

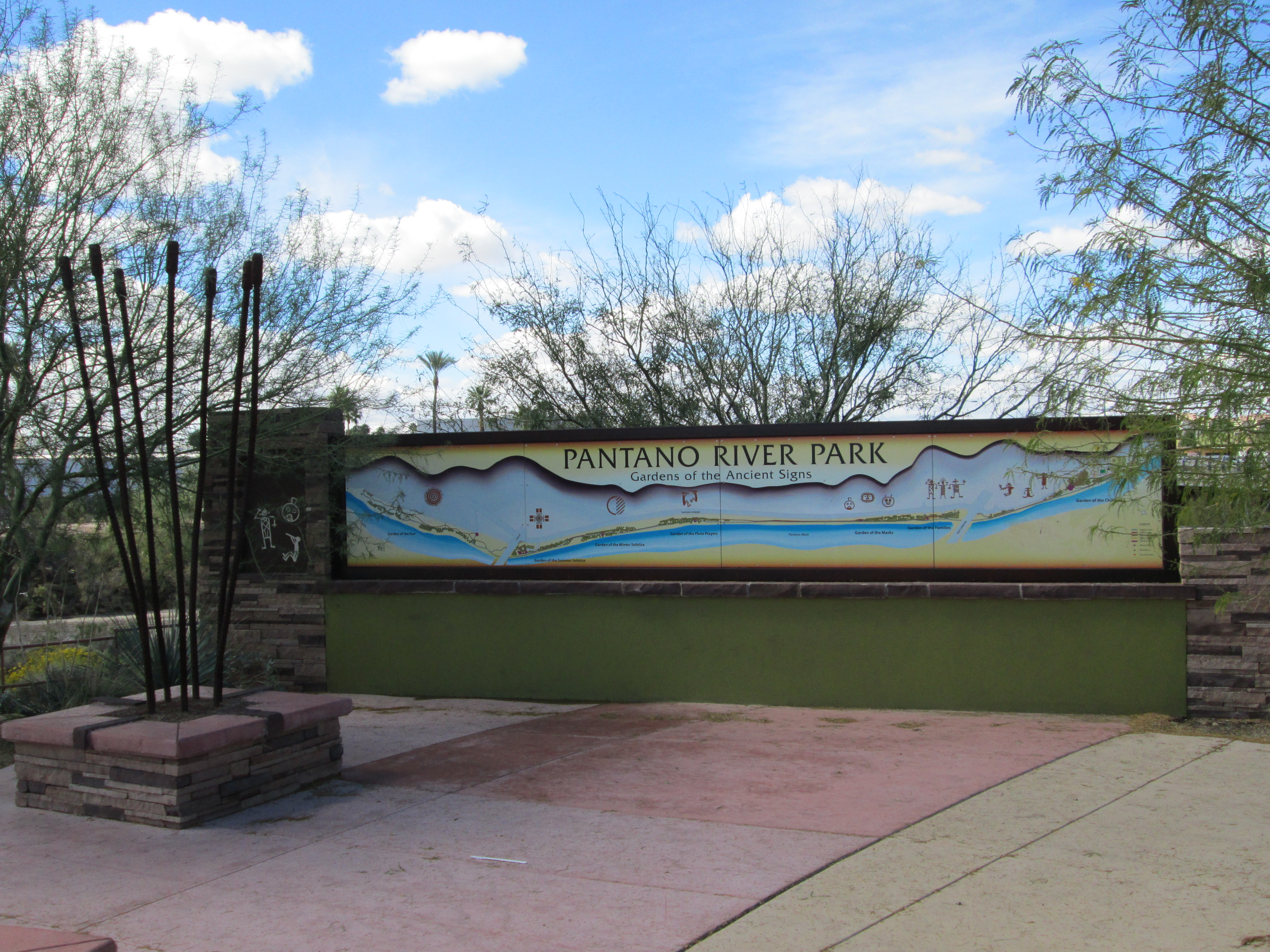
A sign at the entrance to the Pantano River Park in Tucson

== See also ==
- List of rivers of Arizona
- Santa Cruz River
- Cienega
