= Jimmie Mercer =

Arizona lawman and pioneer (1871–1914)

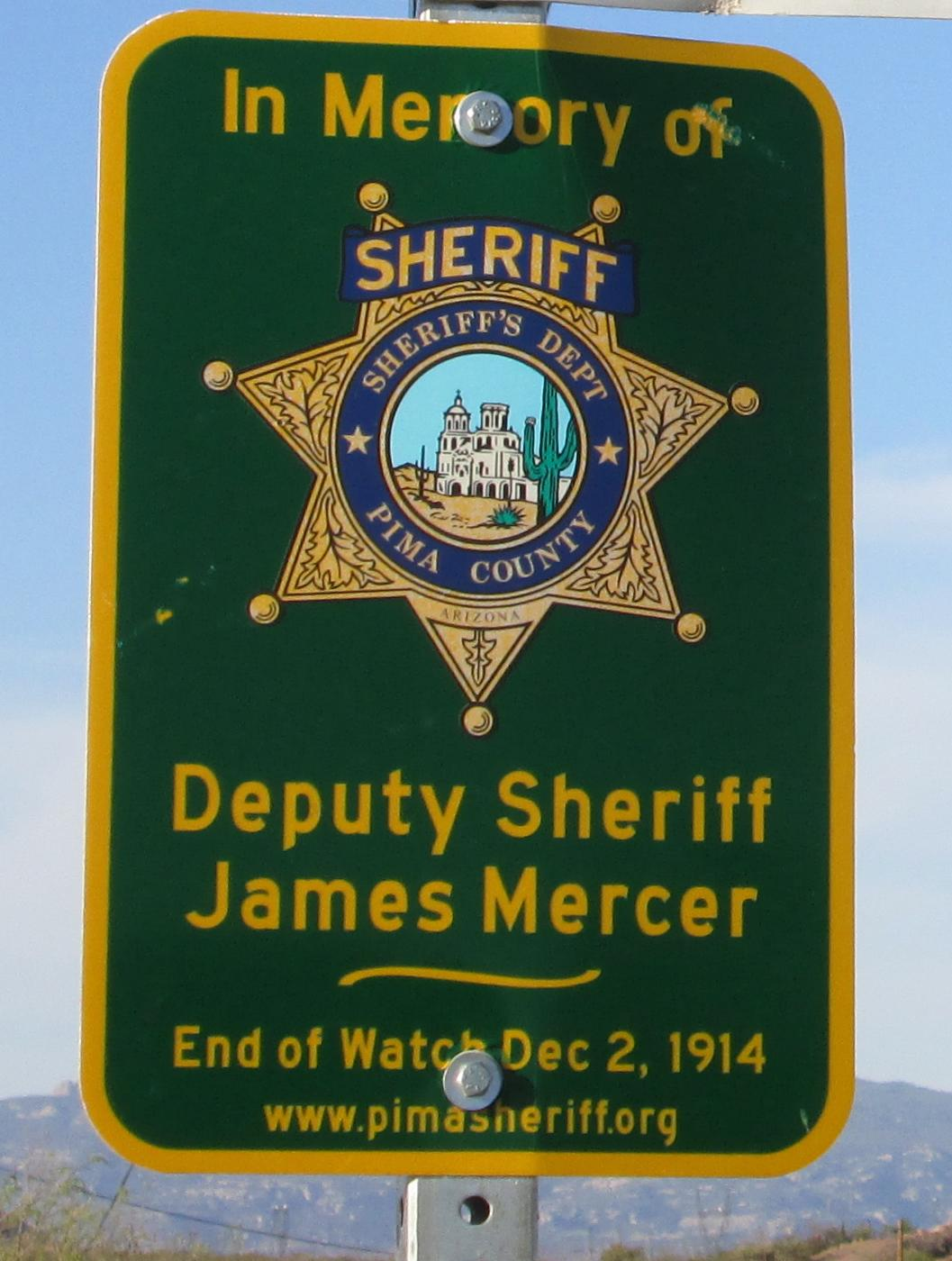
- A memorial for Jimmie Mercer at the Ciénega Creek Natural Preserve.
- Born: James Arthur Mercer; August 12, 1871; England
- Died: December 10, 1914 (aged 43); Tucson, Arizona, US
- Occupation: Lawman

James Arthur Mercer (August 12, 1871 – December 10, 1914) was a lawman and pioneer in Arizona Territory in the late 19th century and early 20th century. He was badly wounded by a suspected cattle rustler near the town of Pantano on December 2, 1914, and died about a week later in a Tucson hospital.

== Biography ==
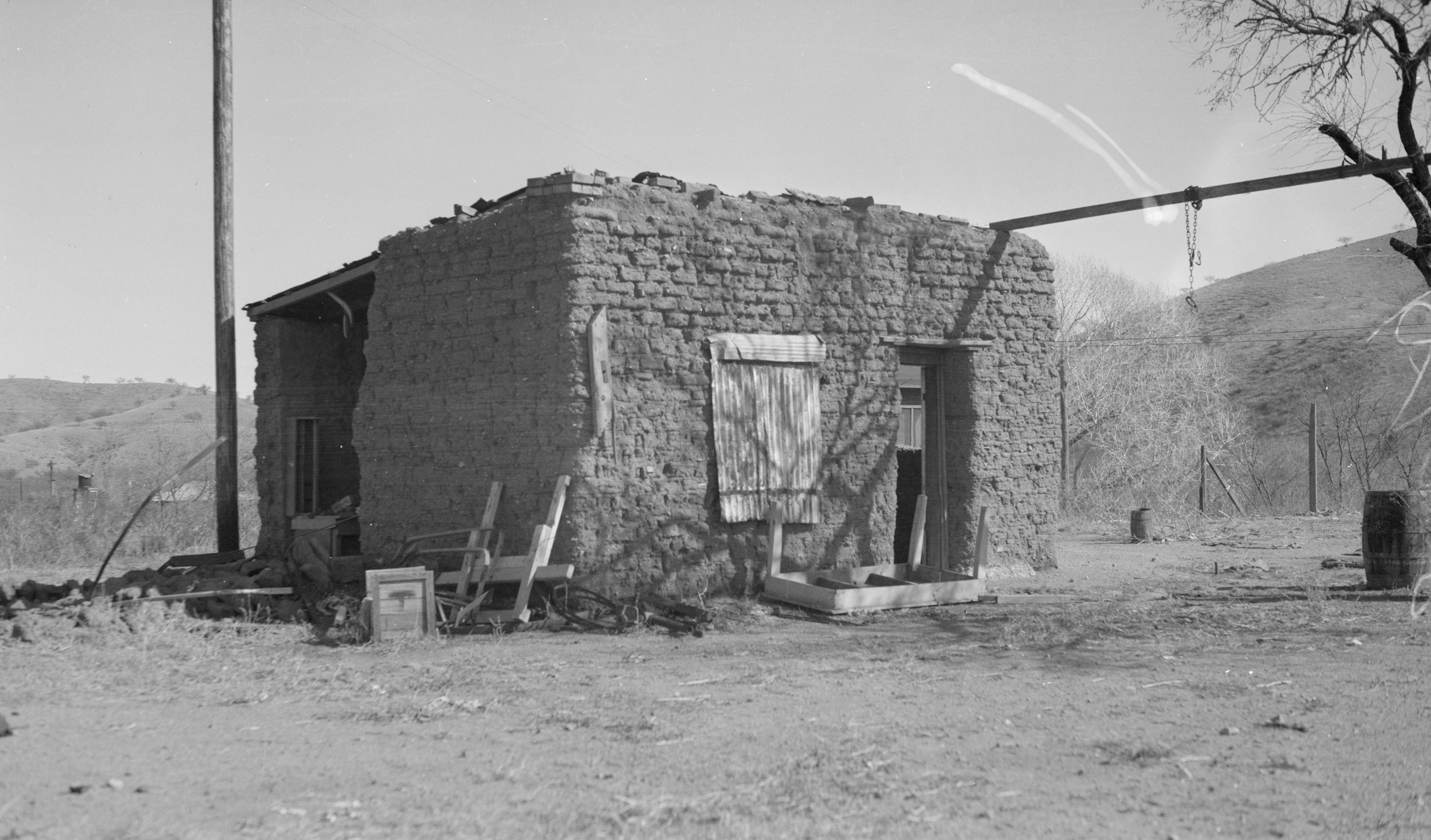
The old Pete Kitchen Ranch house in 1937.

James Arthur "Jimmie" Mercer was born in England on August 12, 1871, and was the eldest child of Andrew Valentine Mercer and Isabella Katherine Newton. Jimmie was named after Andrew's father, James Arthur Mercer (1812–1878). In 1883, Jimmie and his parents emigrated to the United States and settled down in Tubac, Arizona, where Andrew's elder brother, T. Lillie Mercer, had previously settled. Andrew and Isabella divorced when Jimmie was twelve-years-old, after which he was raised by a family friend named Pete Kitchen. According to Jimmie's nephew, Art Mercer: "Jimmie lived with Pete and his family until he was 14 or 15 years old.... Pete was quite a desperado. When some squaws tried to steal his horses, Jimmie killed two of the women."

Jimmie's first marriage was to Bessie Pearl McKinney, who was born in 1883, in Uvalde, Texas, and was the daughter of a well known and respected pioneer rancher. The two were married in Mammoth, Arizona, on July 16, 1898. Jimmie was popular and respected. He worked as a Pima County deputy sheriff and later a county ranger. The Mercers had three sons: Arthur Virgil Mercer, who was born on January 3, 1900, Caddell Newton Mercer, who was born on April 21, 1903, and Edgar Leslie Mercer, born on February 10, 1906. With his second wife, Harriett Ann Brown, Jimmie had a fourth son named James Arthur Mercer, Jr. just before his death on December 10, 1914.

On December 2, 1914, Mercer and a local rancher named Robert Fenton were out investigating a police report for some stolen cattle. According to the report, a Mexican rancher named J. Padilla was in possession of a stolen calf, so the two men headed for Padilla's ranch, which was located just north of what is now the ghost town of Pantano. As Mercer and Fenton approached the little ranch, Padilla began walking towards them. However, when about seventy yards away from Mercer, Padilla raised his rifle and fired once at him. The bullet struck Mercer in the left leg, just above the knee. As Mercer fell to the ground, Padilla turned around and fled into a nearby canyon. Mercer was then taken back to Pantano, where he was put on a train and sent to Rogers Hospital in Tucson.

Mercer's wound was bad; the bullet struck him just above the knee, breaking his leg, and he was bleeding a lot. Ultimately, he died from the loss of blood several days later on December 10, and was buried in the Evergreen Memorial Park in Tucson. He was survived by his wife, two brothers, and three sisters. There is no record of whether or not the killer was ever apprehended. Today there is a small memorial for Mercer near Pantano, at the Ciénega Creek Natural Preserve. The Pete Kitchen Ranch, near Nogales, Arizona, is also on display and has been listed on the National Historic Register since 1975.

An obituary for Jimmie was printed in the Arizona Daily Star on December 11, 1914:

James Mercer... died Thursday morning as the result of a wound inflicted at Pantano on the third of December. The deceased, who was a county ranger in Pima County, had been called to Pantano to investigate a case of calf stealing. While he was looking over a calf belonging to a man named Padillas, the latter shot Mercer through the left thigh with a rifle. The injured man was assisted to the station by Robert [Fenton], who was with him at the time, and taken by train where he was cared for at the Rodgers Hospital, where he died at the time stated. Mr. Mercer was a resident of Nogales in the early history of the town, and is remembered by those who knew him in the early days. His parents were located here about thirty years ago when he was a lad of 10 or 12 years of age. His home has been in Pima County for many years. (sic)

== See also ==
- List of Old West lawmen
- Ed Drew
