= Henry Hooker =

American rancher in Arizona Territory (1828–1907)

Henry C. Hooker
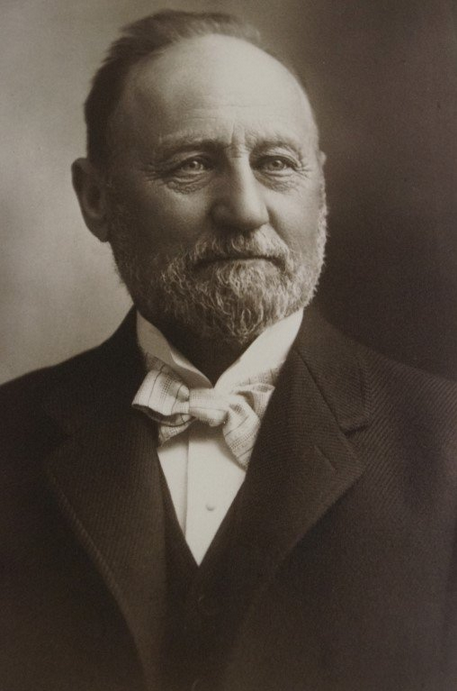
- Hooker in 1907
- Born: Henry Clay Hooker; January 10, 1828; Hinsdale, New Hampshire, Cheshire County; New Hampshire, U.S.A.
- Died: December 5, 1907 (aged 79); 870 West Adams St. Los Angeles, Los Angeles, California, United States
- Occupation: Rancher
- Years active: 1872–1907
- Known for: founder of the Sierra Bonita Ranch, first American cattle ranch in Arizona
- Spouse: Elizabeth Rockwell
- Children: Ida M., Edwin R., and Joseph M

Henry Clay Hooker (January 10, 1828 – December 5, 1907) was a prominent and wealthy rancher during the American Old West who formed the first and what became the largest American ranch in Arizona Territory. After growing up on the east coast, he married and traveled to California, where he established a hardware store in Hangtown. When it burned, he left for Arizona Territory where he partnered with others to supply cattle to the Army and Indian Agencies. When one of the herds stampeded, he found them in a verdant valley. He established the Sierra Bonita Ranch there. It became one of the largest ranches in the Territory and state of Arizona and was held by family members for several generations. He was a personal friend of Wyatt Earp and aided him after the Earp Vendetta Ride.

== Early life ==
Henry Clay Hooker was born January 10, 1828, in Hinsdale, New Hampshire on a farm that had belonged to his great-grandfather. His father was Henry C. Hooker Sr. (1791–1885), a descendant of early New England leader Thomas Hooker, and his mother was Mary Daggett. He was sixth among 10 siblings: Amelia Prentice, Julia Worthington, George Prince, Charles Gay, Anson Carey, Almira Ann, Minerva Sophia, Anson Carey, John Daggett, and Mary Rosella.

== Marriage and move west ==
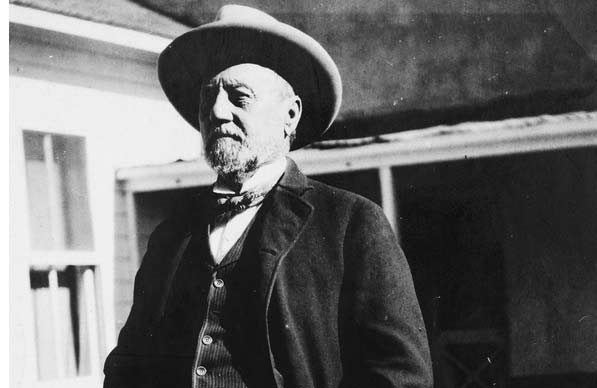
Hooker always preferred to dress like an Eastern gentleman even when working his ranch.

In 1848 he moved first to New York City and then in 1849 to Kansas City, Missouri. He worked for the Indian Department until 1852 when he moved to El Dorado County, California, during the California Gold Rush. He married Elizabeth Rockwell (born December 23, 1837, in Erie, Pennsylvania), daughter of Peter King Rockwell and his wife, Maria Dorcas (née Bell), on March 19, 1856. After trying his hand at mining, they moved to Hangtown, California (later renamed Placerville), in the 1860s. Henry started a mercantile business or hardware store and sold supplies to the miners. Once in a while Henry would buy and drive cattle east, over the Sierra, to sell to the Comstock Lode miners in the region around Carson City and Genoa, Nevada. His business flourished and he and Elizabeth had three children: Ida M. Hooker (born May 3, 1858), Edwin R. Hooker (born February 27, 1861), and Joseph M. Hooker (born September 4, 1863), who married Laura Butler Coffin on November 14, 1906.

On August 10, 1865, a fire destroyed much of Hangtown including Hooker's business and residence. Henry and his family survived with only $1,000.00 (or about $21,000 in today's dollars) that Henry had saved. Searching for a way to rebuild his capital, Hooker came up with the idea of delivering live turkeys to the miners of the Comstock Lode who were willing to pay top dollar for meat. He bought turkeys from a number of local ranchers at a generous price of $1.50 per head (about $32 in present-day dollars). He hired a man, bought two dogs, and started over the Sierra Nevada with 500 turkeys. He almost lost the entire flock near his destination when they took flight at the top of a cliff, but was able to recapture the birds when they landed in the valley below. He drove them through the middle of Carson City and sold them for $5.00 per head, realizing a profit of about $1750 (about $36,800 today).

== Founds Sierra Bonita Ranch ==
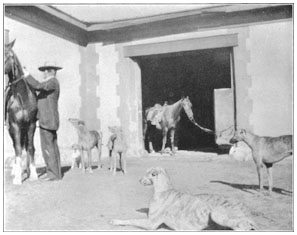
Hooker mounts a horse near several of his greyhound dogs.

Hooker, who was referred by the honorary title of "Colonel Hooker", arrived in the Arizona Territory with the profits from his turkey venture in 1867. He built up a cattle operation supplying beef to the military. He brought 10,000 Texas Longhorns from Texas in 1872.

During one cattle drive in 1872 as they traveled between Mt. Graham and the Galiuro Range northwest of present-day Willcox, Arizona, the cattle stampeded and were found grazing in a verdant valley with abundant water (Spanish ciénega) later named Sulphur Springs Valley. At 4,000 feet (1,200 m) elevation, it supported lush, 12 to 20 inches (300 to 510 mm) tall grass. But the constant threat of Apache raids prevented permanent settlement until after the Civil War ended, when a U.S. Army post was built at Ft. Grant about 10 miles (16 km) to the east, and in the Santa Cruz and San Pedro Valleys, which helped to reduce the Indian raids.

Hooker was impressed by the valley, and after the Apache threat was sufficiently reduced, in 1872 he decided to locate his ranch there. He named it the Sierra Bonita Ranch for the views of the nearby mountains. It was located on the site of a former Spanish hacienda in Sulphur Spring Valley that had been destroyed by the Apache Indians in the early 19th century. The main ranch house was 80 feet (24 m) by 100 feet (30 m). Soon after establishing the ranch, Hooker erected a small adobe fort to fend off raids by the local Apache. They initially cost him numerous losses, both in personnel and equipment. The lush landscape allowed Hooker to pasture up to 15,500 head of cattle there at all times of the year.

Hooker built a sound operation and his ranch was a key part in cattle production in the Arizona Territory that by 1891 supported 1.5 million cattle on the open range. Hooker was one of the few Arizona ranchers to survive a disastrous drought in 1891, which killed over half the cattle due in part to severe overgrazing. Efforts to restore the range-land between 1905 and 1934 had limited success, but ranching continued on a smaller scale. After the 1891 drought, he formed the Sierra Bonita Land and Stock Company, which extended ranching operations to 250,000 acres (1,000 km^{2}) supporting 20,000 head of cattle.

== Associates ==
Hooker hired Billy the Kid before he became famous during the Lincoln County War. Hooker, like many ranchers and businessmen, supported the lawmen Virgil and Wyatt Earp. On March 27, 1882, after the Earp Vendetta Ride, Hooker hosted the Earps and their companions on their way out of the Arizona Territory.

== Death and legacy ==
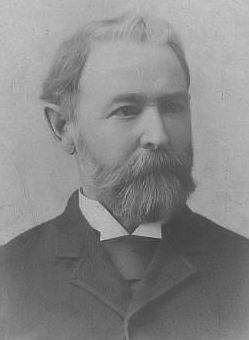
Hooker c. late 1800s

He died December 5, 1907, in Los Angeles. At the time of his death he was the wealthiest rancher in Arizona. As of 2005, the Sierra Bonita Ranch was operated by Mrs. Harry Hooker, granddaughter of Henry Hooker. It remains an operating cattle ranch and is owned as of 2012 by Jesse Hooker Davis, great-great-great-grandson of Henry Hooker, who took over management from his grandmother, Jacqueline Hooker Hughes.

The Sierra Bonita Ranch was declared a National Historic Landmark in 1964 but it is not open to the public. In 1959, Henry Hooker was inducted into the Hall of Great Westerners of the National Cowboy & Western Heritage Museum.

== In popular culture ==
In the 1993 film Tombstone, Hooker was portrayed by actor Charlton Heston.

Lynn R. Bailey wrote a book about him and the ranch titled Henry Clay Hooker and the Sierra Bonita.

== See also ==
- Edward Landers Drew
