= Sierra Bonita Ranch =

United States historic place in Arizona

- U.S. National Register of Historic Places
- U.S. National Historic Landmark
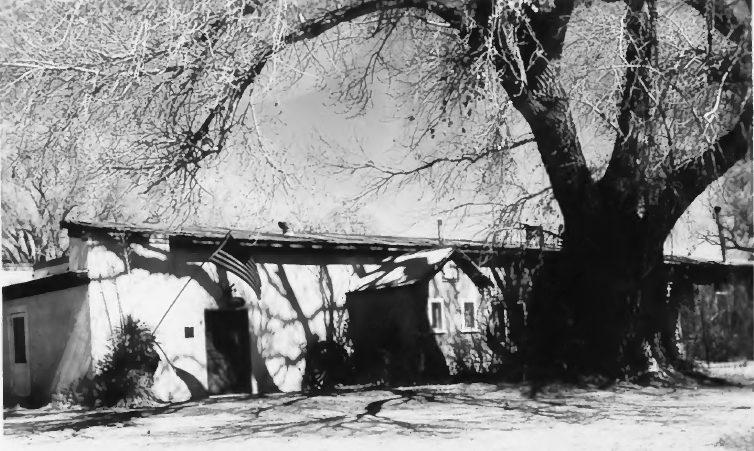
- Sierra Bonita Ranch house, 1975

- Location within Arizona Location within the United States
- Location: Graham County, Arizona, USA
- Nearest city: Willcox, Arizona
- Coordinates: 32°30′37″N 110°02′25″W
- Built: 1872
- Architectural style: Spanish Colonial
- NRHP reference No.: 66000181

Significant dates
- Added to NRHP: October 15, 1966
- Designated NHL: July 19, 1964

The Sierra Bonita Ranch, founded in 1872 by Henry C. Hooker, is one of the oldest cattle ranches in the United States and the ranch buildings have been designated a National Historic Landmark. It was the first permanent American cattle ranch in Arizona. Hooker bought neighboring ranches until his operation became the largest ranch in Arizona, totaling 800 square miles (2,100 km^{2}), or about 30 by 27 miles (48 by 43 km). It is located in Sulphur Springs Valley about 27 miles (43 km) north of present-day Willcox, Arizona. The modern ranch is much smaller but is still operational and owned by Jesse Hooker Davis, the sixth generation to live and work on the ranch.

== Founding ==
Before the arrival of the Spanish, the valley was visited and may have been occupied by Chiricahua Apache. Beginning in about 1775, the Mexican government promoted a policy of Indian appeasement that reduced hostilities. By the early 1800s there were a number of Mexican rancheros in the area that managed thousands of cattle on the open range. As a result of the Mexican War of Independence, the settlers in the northern regions lost the government's protection. Apaches stole or killed most of the cattle, and the settlers who didn't return to the interior of Mexico were killed. By about 1840 the only evidence of their former presence were some ruins and a few herds of wild cattle. The California Gold Rush that began in 1849 drew a large number of people through the area, but by this time only the Apache occupied the area.

Prior to the Gold Rush, cattle were primarily valued for their hides and tallow. A mature steer rarely fetched more than $4.00 a head (or about $155 today). The miners and merchants who came to California as a result of the Gold Rush fed an explosion in the state's population and a concurrent demand for beef. The price of cattle rose up to $75 a head (around $1,577 today). Ranchers could turn a profit driving cattle from as far as Oklahoma, Texas, New Mexico and Arizona to California even though the Chiricahua Apaches took many cattle. The ranchers would drive the cattle up California's Central Valley. Once they arrived in the San Joaquin Valley and Sacramento Valley, they would rent pasture and fatten the cattle up before selling them for a handsome profit.

When Hooker arrived in Arizona from California in 1867, he partnered with Captain Hugh Hinds, who Hooker knew from Placerville. Hinds had secured a U.S. government contract to supply beef to military posts and Indian agencies in Arizona. Hooker visited each agency to assess how much beef each needed. Hooker followed that contract with another by partnering with pioneer cattlemen William B. Hooper and James M. Barney in a similar venture.

A family legend says that a herd of cattle stampeded and Hooker's range hands found the cattle in what later became known as Sulphur Springs Valley. Hooker liked the valley and decided to start a ranch there.

=== Ranch buildings ===
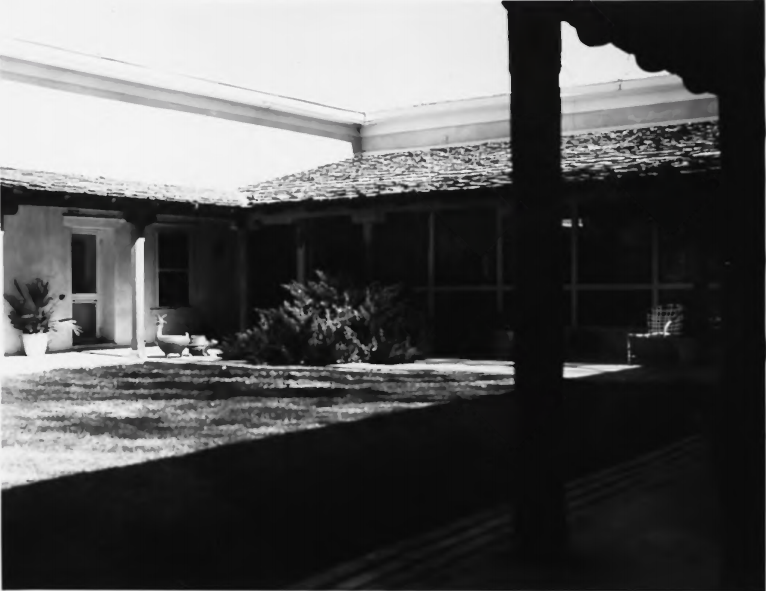
Enclosed courtyard of the main residence of the Sierra Bonita Ranch

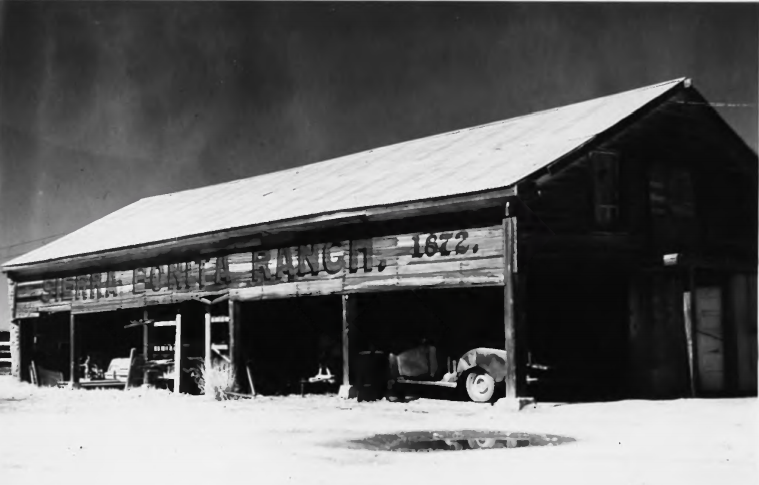
The historic wood and adobe barn at the Sierra Bonita Ranch. The sign was painted in 1972 upon the 100th anniversary of the ranch's founding.

Hooker established his ranch in 1872 on the site of a former Spanish hacienda, one of those destroyed by the Apache many years before. His main ranch house was a large, rectangular, U-shaped structure 80 feet (24 m) by 100 feet (30 m) surrounding a central patio. The walls were built of two rows of adobe bricks 20 inches (510 mm) thick and 16 feet (4.9 m) high. To maximize security, none of the building's outside walls had doors or windows. The only access was through a single gate in a fourth wall, although another door was added in another wall years later when security improved. To maximize self-sufficiency, the patio originally contained a well and a root cellar, but they were later filled in. The roof had gunports in the parapets. Hooker developed a relationship with the Apache Indians who used a trail through the valley near his ranch compound. The trail ran between the United States and Mexico, but Hooker rarely had trouble from them.

By 1885, Hooker bought other nearby ranches. He built up his herds and brought in expensive bulls and blooded cows. He maintained a dairy herd that kept the ranch supplied with butter and milk. He put in 1,000 acres (400 ha) of alfalfa and timothy, and planted acres of corn and artichokes to use as feed for a large number of well-bred hogs. He had hen houses built to supply the ranch with chickens and eggs. He bought six purebred stallions and ran over 500 brood mares that produced horses that became known for their speed, beauty and temperament.

The ranch eventually included lands in Graham and Cochise Counties. It became the largest ranch in Arizona, totaling 800 square miles (2,100 km^{2}). Hooker was committed to quality livestock and in the 1880s he improved his herds by importing Hereford graded stock. He was noted for breeding some of the best cattle, horses, sheep, and dogs in the country.

Hooker built a number of other buildings that still survive, including the original barn, built of adobe and wood. It was decorated in 1972 with the words "Sierra Bonita Ranch 1872", in honor of the ranch's centennial. North of the main house is a weather-worn adobe bunkhouse with a tin roof and a large adobe corral for storing hay. Other historic corrals at the ranch are made of adobe and wooden planks. Some of the older structures have become unusable, but due to the limitations imposed by the National Historic Structures designation, Davis doesn't want to spend money to rebuild them.

=== Ranch social life ===
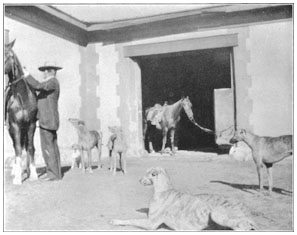
Henry C. Hooker mounts a horse near several of his greyhound dogs.

The ranch became a social center in the southeastern Arizona Territory. Hooker hosted politicians, government and military officials, artists, writers, and scientists. When invited to dinner, everyone was required to wear a coat, and Hooker kept a few extra on hand for guests who didn't have one. Hooker always dressed like an Eastern gentleman and never wore cowboy clothing, even when on the range. Playwright Augustus Thomas set his play Arizona at the ranch and based the two primary characters Canby and Bonita on Hooker's family.

=== Geography and water supply ===
The valley is at 4,000 feet (1,200 m) elevation, allowing the ranch to escape extremes of heat and cold, and thus provided an ideal breeding range. The plentiful water supply included five springs, creeks that flowed in the spring and fall, and abundant, shallow groundwater easily tapped by wells. In case of drought, Hooker had ditches dug that brought water from the mountains to reservoirs on his ranch. Control of a reliable water source gave Hooker the ability to control a range approximately 30 miles (48 km) long and 30 miles (48 km) wide.

=== Cattle operations ===
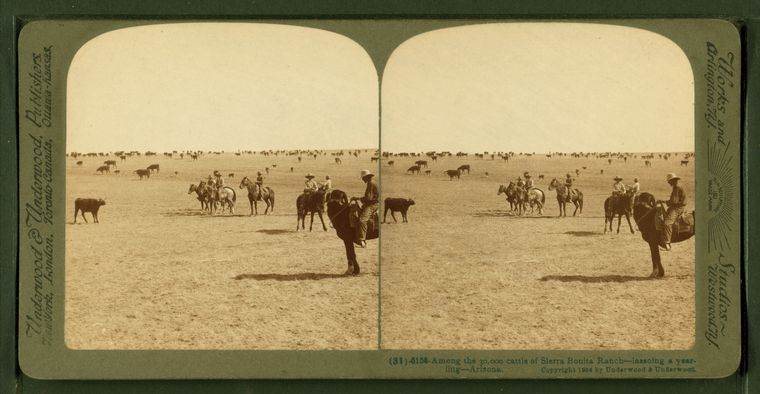
Stereoscopic view of a portion of the 30,000 head of cattle on the Sierra Bonita Ranch.

Hooker became the largest supplier of beef to the military in the Arizona Territory. Hooker Initially suffered heavy losses, both in personnel and supplies, due to Apache raids. Hooker originally stocked his ranch with Texas Longhorns and low-grade Mexican corrientes before replacing them with Durham cattle. In the 1880s Hooker improved his herds further by importing Hereford graded stock.

He gradually built his holdings until he controlled 250,000 acres (1,000 km^{2}) that carried 20,000 head. In the Arizona Territory from 1873 to 1891, cattle herds grew from 40,000 to 1.5 million head. Hooker built a sound operation and was one of the few Arizona ranchers to survive a disastrous drought in 1891, which killed over half the cattle due in part to severe overgrazing. Efforts to restore the rangeland between 1905 and 1934 had limited success, but ranching continued on a smaller scale. When he died in 1907, Hooker was still the cattle king of Arizona.

== Present operations ==
The Sierra Bonita Ranch was declared a National Historic Landmark in 1964. It is among the oldest ranches in the United States.

It remains an operating cattle ranch and is owned as of 2012 by Jesse Hooker Davis, great-great-great-grandson of Henry Hooker, who took over management from his grandmother, Jacqueline Hooker Hughes. The ranch currently includes 45,000 acres (18,000 ha), about one-fifth the size of the operation under its founder, Henry Hooker. Some of the land was lost to homesteaders allowed on the property in the early 20th century by the federal government, and some has been portioned off to other family members. The property currently includes only two of the original five wells, and the ranch no longer includes any of the mountain ranges and their water supplies.

The adobe ranch house has been remodeled inside, but it still retains the fortress-like appearance of early days. It is shaded by giant cottonwoods and surrounded by the original adobe corrals, bunkhouses, and barns. The integrity of the site is exceptional for three reasons: Continuity, appearance of the buildings, and the same setting that first attracted Col. Hooker. The ranch is not open to the public.

== See also ==
- Edward Landers Drew
