= Ed Drew =

American deputy sheriff (1865–1911)

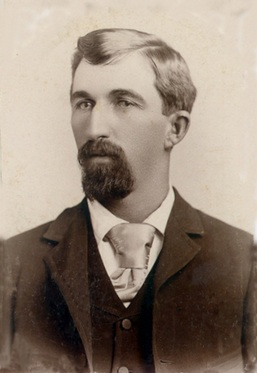
- Drew c. 1905
- Born: Edward Landers Drew; August 22, 1865; Lander, Wyoming, U.S.
- Died: May 15, 1911 (aged 45); Sonoratown, Arizona Territory, U.S.
- Occupations: Deputy sheriff, rancher, miner

Edward Landers Drew (August 22, 1865 – May 15, 1911) was an American rancher, miner, and lawman in the final years of the Old West. He is most remembered for his family of pioneers and his death during a shootout near Ray.

== Early life ==
Edward Landers Drew was born at Lander, Wyoming on August 22, 1865, while his parents, William Henry Harrison Drew and Georgiann Stuart Drew, were crossing the Great Plains to Montana. His twin brother, Edwin Drew, died at birth, but he had other siblings to grow up with.

== Move to Arizona ==
By 1876, the Drew family had made their way down to Arizona Territory and settled along the San Pedro River near Contention City. There William Drew built a ranch and a stagecoach station, which later became known as Drew's Station.

In his youth, both Drew and his younger sister, Cora, became skilled equestrians. They won several contests in Arizona and New Mexico Territory between the 1890s and the early 1900s. In 1888, at the age of sixteen, Cora was asked to perform in Buffalo Bill's Wild West by Buffalo Bill Cody himself. Her mother refused to allow it though, probably due to her age, but Cora did get to attend the 1893 World's Fair in Chicago, Illinois.

=== Death of Bud Philpot ===
On March 15, 1881, Drew heard the sound of gunfire that killed Bud Philpot. Philpot, a stagecoach driver, was ambushed and robbed in one of the many incidents leading to the historic Gunfight at the O.K. Corral in Tombstone. After mounting his horse, Drew rode towards the sound of the gunfire and found Philpot's body lying in a wash. He then rode to the house of a neighboring rancher, T. W. Ayles, who, coincidentally, was in the process of writing a letter to the Tombstone Epitaph concerning lawlessness in the territory. Ayles wrote: "Right here I am stopped by the entrance of a messenger who reports that down coach from Tombstone to-night, and which passed here a[t] 8:00 p.m., had been shot into and 'Bud', the driver is now lying on the roadside, dead, with his whip alongside of him. And just now Eddie Drew, a young son of the station keeper at Drew's Station, informs me that he saw the dead man and recognized him as 'Bud,' the driver of the coach."

=== Bass Canyon ranch ===
In 1884, after two years of working as a wagon teamster at the Johnson mine, Drew, two Mexican men, and a man named Melvin Jones went into the Sulphur Springs Valley to build a cattle ranch at Bass Canyon, bringing a herd along with them. However, when they were riding through the land of Glendy King, the old recluse refused to let them pass. Drew told King that he intended to go on with or without permission so the latter opened fire on Drew with a rifle, shooting the reins out of his hands. Melvin Jones then responded by pulling out his Winchester and shooting King, who died as result. Rumors that renegade Apaches killed King immediately began circulating.

Drew turned himself a little while later to the local sheriff and the true story was revealed. After being exonerated of shooting King, Drew and Melvin built their ranch. Drew went to Mexico to buy horses, leaving Melvin to manage things. When he returned with 1,000 head of horses three months later, Drew found that Melvin had not accomplished what they had agreed to so Drew ended the partnership. The ranch then became known as the Drew Ranch.

=== Work for Henry Hooker ===
Between 1894 and 1910, Drew worked as a cowboy and foreman of the Sierra Bonita Ranch, which was owned by Colonel Henry Hooker. He married Marie Preston of West Virginia on March 20, 1898, and they went on to have three children. That same year, the Drew Ranch was sold to Sam and Johnny Boyett, the latter of whom would later gain notoriety for killing Warren Earp during a dispute at a saloon in Willcox.

=== Move to Pima, Arizona ===
According to newspapers from 1900, Drew bought a farm at Pima from a man named John Nash and settled there with his family, however, he continued working at the Sierra Bonita Ranch. The newspapers also say that Drew fractured one of his legs that year, after he accidentally rode off the edge of a cliff with his horse.

By 1909, Drew had a mining claim in the Turquoise District. The local newspaper reported on February 12, 1909 that Drew sold his one-third interest in the Triangle No. 1 Mining Claim and that a Mrs. L. J. Lemion, who owned the other two-thirds, sold her share as well. Drew was to be paid $3,333,33 in installments over the next few years, but he was killed in Sonoratown on May 15, 1911.

== Death at Sonoratown ==
On February 11, 1911, Drew accepted an appointment from the Pinal County sheriff, James E. McGree, to become his deputy. He was, however, killed just a short time after being sworn in. On the night of May 15, 1911, shortly before 12:00 A.M., Drew was in a saloon at Sonoratown, a small mining town located just south of Ray, Arizona, when a bandit named Jack Monroe entered through the back door with a mask over his face and a revolver in his hand.

According to a May 17, 1911, edition of the Arizona Republican, Drew was immediately confronted by Monroe, who said: "Throw up your hands." There was a moment of hesitation though, because Drew was not going to give up without a fight. Monroe then stepped closer and slapped Drew in the face, saying: "Throw up your hands damned quick." But instead, Drew pulled out his revolver and was subsequently struck by a bullet from Monroe. According to the Arizona Republican, the shot did not incapacitate Drew, who then began firing and advancing on Monroe. Monroe retreated to behind the bar and the fighting continued for a few seconds until Drew fell over dead. He had been shot twice and it was later determined that Monroe was also badly wounded in the chest, but managed to escape town.

The May 17, 1911, edition of the Arizona Republican says the following:

E.L. Drew of Ray, a deputy of Pinal county, was shot and killed by an unknown masked man [Jack Monroe] in a saloon in Sonoratown, a suburb of Ray, a few minutes before 12 o'clock, Monday night. Whether the shooting was an incident of a planned hold-up for the purpose of robbery, or whether it was planned as a murder for revenge, seems not to be a settled point in Ray. The murderer made no effort to rob the saloon thereafter, and so far as know[n] Drew had no personal enemies, being universally liked as an officer. Glen Hartford was seated in a chair nearby and Jack Russell, the bartender, was close to the other two men and in between them. The masked man, whose nationality even has not been learned here, entered with a revolver in his hand and gave the order "Throw up your hands." Russell and Hartfort obeyed at once. Drew hesitated in his course of action until the second command came to "Throw up your hands damned quick." As Drew still reclined the stranger stepped up and slapped him, whereupon Drew pulled his revolver and before he could use it his assailant fired. It seemed as though Drew was waiting to get the drop on his assailant, or at least an even break with him, before reaching for his gun. When the masked man fired Drew faltered for a moment as thought [though] the shot had been effective, but quickly recovering he advanced upon on his adversary, who he forced to the rear of the barroom while bullets were flying, the intruder [Monroe] taking refuge behind the bar until Drew fell, mortally wounded with two bullet holes th[r]ough him. It has not definitely established, according to the [Arizona] Republican's information, whether Drew ever fired a shot or not, or whether the other man was injured in the battle. No bullet holes were found in the room that seemed to have come from his [Drew] direction, however, and the murderer was able to make a hasty departure as soon as his victim fell. Drew is spoken of as a man well liked in the community, and no incident is recalled in which he participated that would be likely to have left a spirit of revenge strong enough to stimulate a man to murder. In fact the only person that seem[s] might have borne him revenge is a Mexican whom he arrested a short time ago for beating his wife, but so far as learned here there is no certainty that the murderer was a Mexican. The only other incentive suggested is the proposed robbery of the saloon, and if that was planned the murderer gave it up after he killed Drew, evidently believing that time was more valuable that [than] money at that juncture. The officers are following every possible clew [clue], according to report, but at this time will not admit that they have any definite suspicions as to the identity of the culprit. Drew went to Ray [Sonoratown] from Pearce, a mining camp in Cochise county, it is understood, and his was body was brought fro[m] Ray yesterday afternoon, as far as Tempe, and from there sent to Pearce on last night's train. (sic)

The murderer, Jack Monroe, was captured a few days later at his camp outside of Ray and dealt with accordingly. Drew's body was taken to Pearce by his brother, Charles, and he was buried in the Pearce Cemetery next to his mother, Georgiann, who died in 1906. Presently, Drew's tombstone mistakenly says that he died on May 11, 1911, instead of May 15.

The following was written in a Courtland, Arizona newspaper on May 20, 1911:

Monday night, at about midnight, E.L. Drew, a deputy sheriff of Pinal county, was killed in Sonoratown, a suburb of Ray, while resisting a holdup in one of the saloons. Mr. Drew was well known in Courtland, where he held a commission as deputy sheriff for a considerable time and was very generally liked, and probably as well known throughout the valley and surrounding country as any man in the territory, having been a resident of this section for many years. The body was brought to Pearce by a brother, Charles, who was also employed at Ray and the funeral took place Wednesday afternoon. A large attendance was at band and beautiful floral pieces evidenced the esteem in which he was held. Mrs. Drew with her three pretty children, one girl 12 years old, another 10 and a boy of 7 years, through poor train connections, was compelled to drive from Cochise [County], making five o'clock the hour of the services. Dr. Pestal and Judge [William] Monmonier conducted the services in an able manner. Mr. Drew was born on the [Great] Plains, August 22, 1864 [1865], when his parents were crossing to Montana and is survived by a wife and three children. three brothers, and one sister, G. [George] H. Drew of Pearce, Chas. [Charles] Drew at Pearce, D. [David] S. Drew, who moved last week from Courtland to California and Mrs. R. [Cora] J. Reynolds in Oklahoma City, Oklahoma. Aside from a house and lot in Courtland and 1000 shares of Gold Queen [mine] stock, which was in the names of the children, a $3,500 insurance policy also payable to the children was left by the murdered man. Mrs. Drew and the children have been living at Pima, Graham county and had just about completed arrangements for moving to Ray, where the family could be reunited, when this terrible affair happened. Manager E. H. McFall of the Palace Stables, Hal Mattingly, W. A. Lewis and John Perkins drove to Pearce to attend the funeral, and several others would have been present had they been advised in time to have been there. A report reached Courtland Thursday, that Jack Monroe, suspected as being the man who fired the fatal shots, had been captured near Ray, suffering from a bad gun shot wound in the breast, which makes it appear that Mr. Drew made a commendable resistance, even though he lost his life in doing so. (sic)

The following appeared in the Tombstone Prospector on May 18, 1911:

Jack Monroe has been arrested as suspect of a holdup in a saloon at Ray in which Ed Drew of Courtland was shot and killed about three days ago. Monroe was found in the hills near Ray shot and weak from loss of blood from his wounds, and now the officers suspicion him as the party to the bold hold-up and claim to have strong evidence against Monroe. The hold-up man entering through the back way met Ed Drew at the back door and commanded him to hold up his hands, but instead of raising his hands Drew reached for his gun and fired while the robber fired also and Drew fell to the floor dead. Drew was a former Cochise county resident, having lived at Courtland. Jack Monroe is also a former Cochise resident. In 1904 he was sentenced in the district court here to serve six years at Yuma. He was convicted on a charge of assault on a Mexican at Don Luis. (sic)

The Drew Ranch is now owned by the Nature Conservancy. Also, members of Drew's family still live in Arizona today.

== See also ==
- List of Old West lawmen
- Cochise County in the Old West
- Jimmie Mercer
