= Rillito River =

River in Pima County, Arizona, US

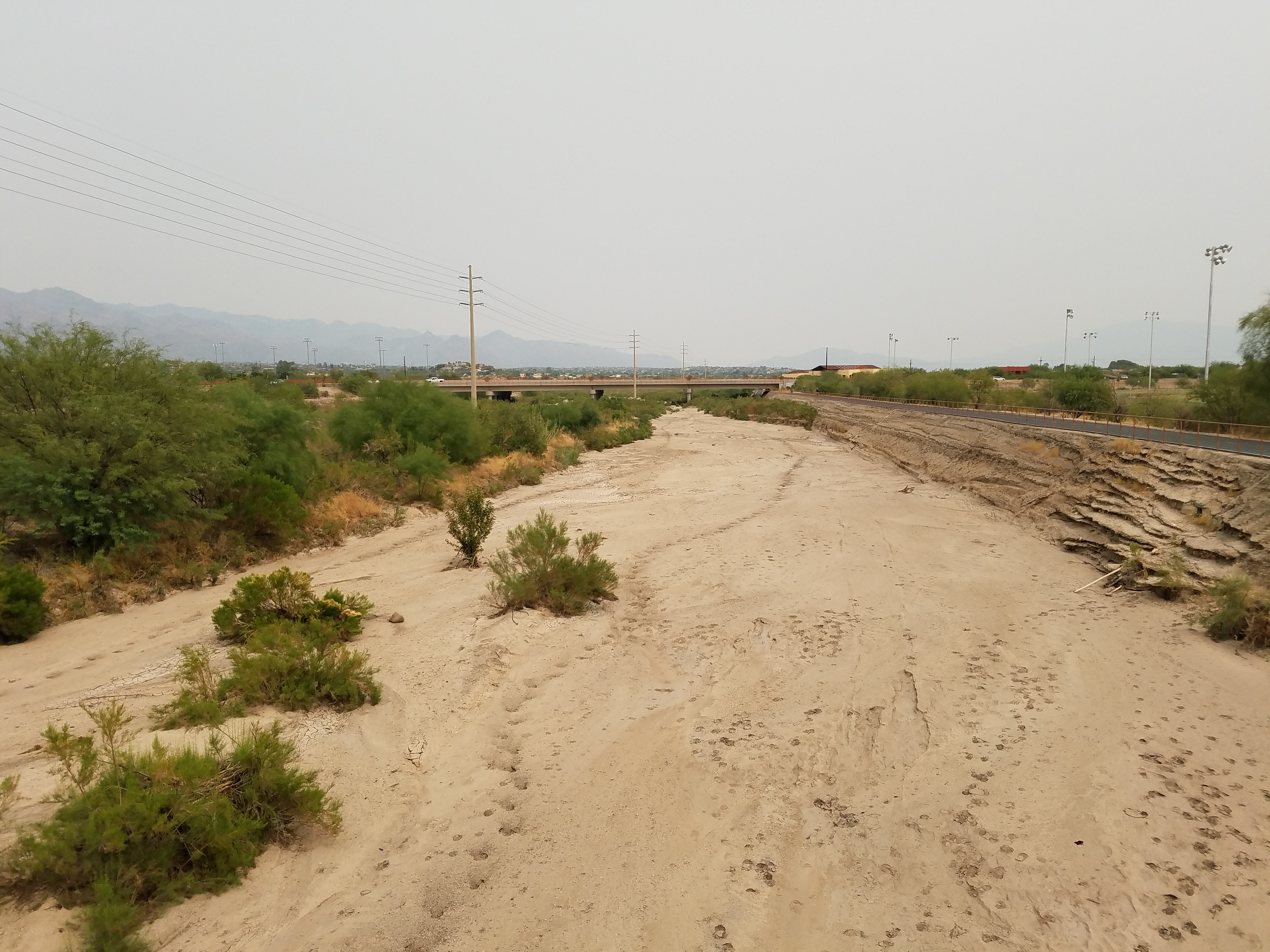
- Dry riverbed near Dodge Blvd

- Location within Arizona
- Etymology: Spanish word meaning "Little River"

Location
- Country: United States
- State: Arizona
- City: Tucson, Arizona

Physical characteristics
- Source: Confluence of North and South Forks
  - location: Pima County, Arizona
  - coordinates: 32°16′7″N 110°52′31″W
- Mouth: Santa Cruz River
  - location: Pima County, Arizona
  - coordinates: 32°18′49″N 111°3′18″W
  - elevation: 2,195 ft (669 m)
- Length: 12.2 mi (19.6 km)

Basin features
- Tributaries
  - left: Tanque Verde Creek
  - right: Pantano Wash

The Rillito River (Spanish pronunciation: [ˈriʝito]; Spanish "Little River") is a river in Pima County, Arizona. It flows from east to west across the northern boundary of the City of Tucson from the confluence of Tanque Verde Creek and Pantano Wash to the Santa Cruz River 12.2 miles (19.6 km) away. The Rillito River Park runs along the north and south banks of the river from Interstate 10 to North Craycroft Road.

== History ==
Prior to colonization by European settlers, much of the Santa Cruz valley was filled with riparian habitats, including numerous zones along the banks of the Rillito River. As recently as the late 19th century, the river was a perennial stream lined with trees and dense vegetation such as cottonwoods, willows, and mesquites. However, increased groundwater pumping for irrigation and urban development eventually caused the river to dry up, leading to the loss of much of its riparian habitat by the mid-20th century. The loss of vegetation led to increased erosion of the river banks during flood events, which in turn led to a widening and straightening of the river channel.

Today, the Rillito is an ephemeral river that carries water only during floods or snowmelt. In the late 20th century, as a flood control measure, many segments of the riverbanks were stabilized with soil cement to reduce erosion and prevent overflow that could damage property.
