= Pantano, Arizona =

- Ghost town
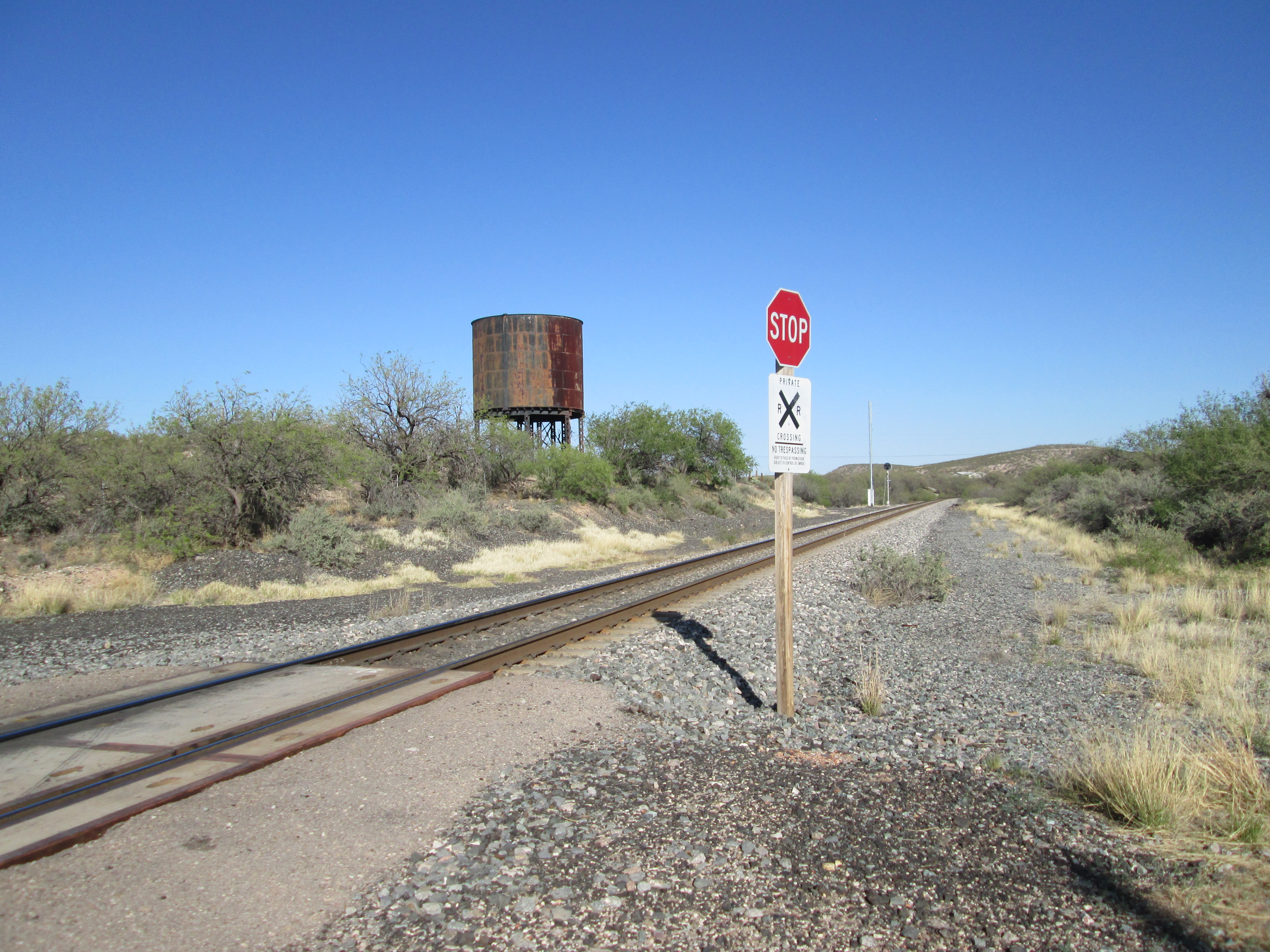
- The railroad crossing and water tower in Pantano.

- Location within Arizona
- Coordinates: 31°59′58″N 110°34′48″W
- Country: United States
- State: Arizona
- County: Pima
- Elevation: 3,553 ft (1,083 m)

Population (1922)
  - Total: ~500
- Time zone: Mountain (MST)
- Post office opened: July 2, 1880
- Post office closed: 1952

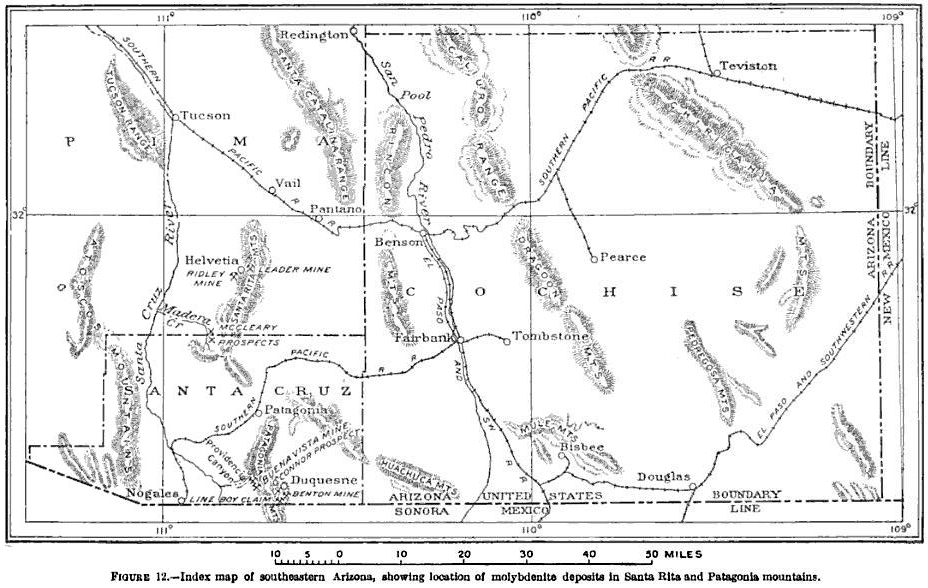
A USGS map of southeastern Arizona from 1910 that includes Pantano.

Pantano is a ghost town located in eastern Pima County, Arizona, between Benson and Vail. Access is via the Marsh Station Road interchange on I-10. It was established as a small railroad town with the arrival of the Southern Pacific in 1880, supplanting the earlier Ciénega station that was located to the west of Pantano.

== History ==
Ciénega Station was established by the Butterfield Overland Mail company in 1858. Built over the site of a Hohokam village, the station and later town went by many names over the years, including Pantano Station, Marsh Station, Tulleyville, and Empire. In the early days, hostile Apaches were a constant problem. The wife of Granville Henderson Oury described her journey through the area in 1861: "We are traveling through country which has always been infested by Indians, and very recently they have committed depredations and horrible atrocities on this very road. Our party is very small and there would be no escape for us if a party of Apaches were to attack us. We all realize this and are trusting to some good fortune or fate to get us through safely."

One morning in 1867, a pioneer named W. A. "Shotgun" Smith and three of his companions were attacked by Apaches at the station. All three of his friends were killed, but with his shotgun Smith managed to shoot down several of the hostiles and force the rest to withdraw at noon. According to Edward Vail, who owned the nearby Vail Ranch, the Pantano Cemetery is "filled with graves of men killed by Indians."

The Pantano railroad station and the town of Pantano were not established until 1880, when the Southern Pacific entered Pima County and began building along the south side of Ciénega Creek. The original townsite was chosen for its favorable location to build a depot and other railroad facilities. The location also attracted private businesses and settlers, who built several warehouses and homes, a small store with a blacksmith, and a carpenter's shop. Seventy-five people were living in Pantano in 1880, and in 1887 severe flooding forced them to relocate the town to the northern side of the creek.

By 1905, the town's population had increased to 100, including a deputy sheriff, a justice of the peace, and six small businesses, including a general store and livery. Pantano reached its zenith in 1922, with a bank, a schoolhouse (run by School District No. 22, Pima County), a telegraph office, and a post office, all serving the town's 500 residents. Soon after, however, the Great Depression began and the town went into decline. Only forty people were left in 1941. The post office closed in 1952 and railroad operations ceased by 1956, leaving the town abandoned. In the 1960s, Southern Pacific leveled most of the buildings in town.

The Pantano Townsite Conservation Area, which is located almost entirely within the Ciénega Creek Natural Preserve, was established in 2004 to protect the townsite and its cultural resources. As of today, all that remains in the ghost town are a few foundations, a water tower and pumphouse that was built by the railroad, and the cemetery.

Jimmie Mercer

On December 2, 1914, a Pima County Ranger named Jimmie Mercer and a local rancher named Robert Fenton were fired on by a Mexican cattle rustler named J. Padilla as the two were approaching the latter's ranch, north of Pantano. One bullet struck Mercer in the leg above the knee before the gunman fled into a nearby canyon and escaped.

Mercer was taken back to Pantano and put on a train to Tucson, where he died about a week later on December 10, 1914. Today there is a small memorial for him near Pantano, at the entrance to the Ciénega Creek Natural Preserve. The Pete Kitchen Ranch, where Mercer spent a few years of his childhood, is also on display, and is located a few miles north of Nogales, Arizona.

== Gallery ==
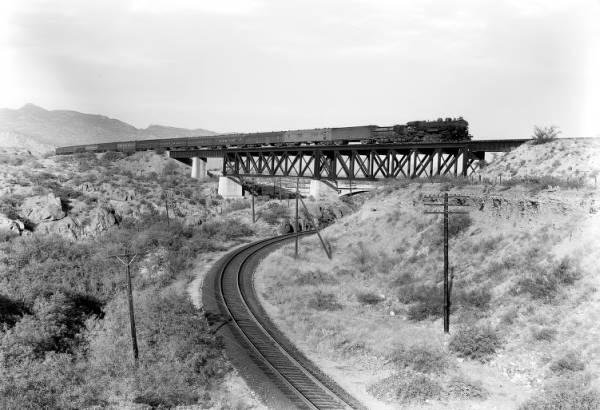
The Sunset Express crossing the Marsh Station Bridge at Ciénega Creek in 1921.

A Southern Pacific train passing through the site of Pantano in 1974.

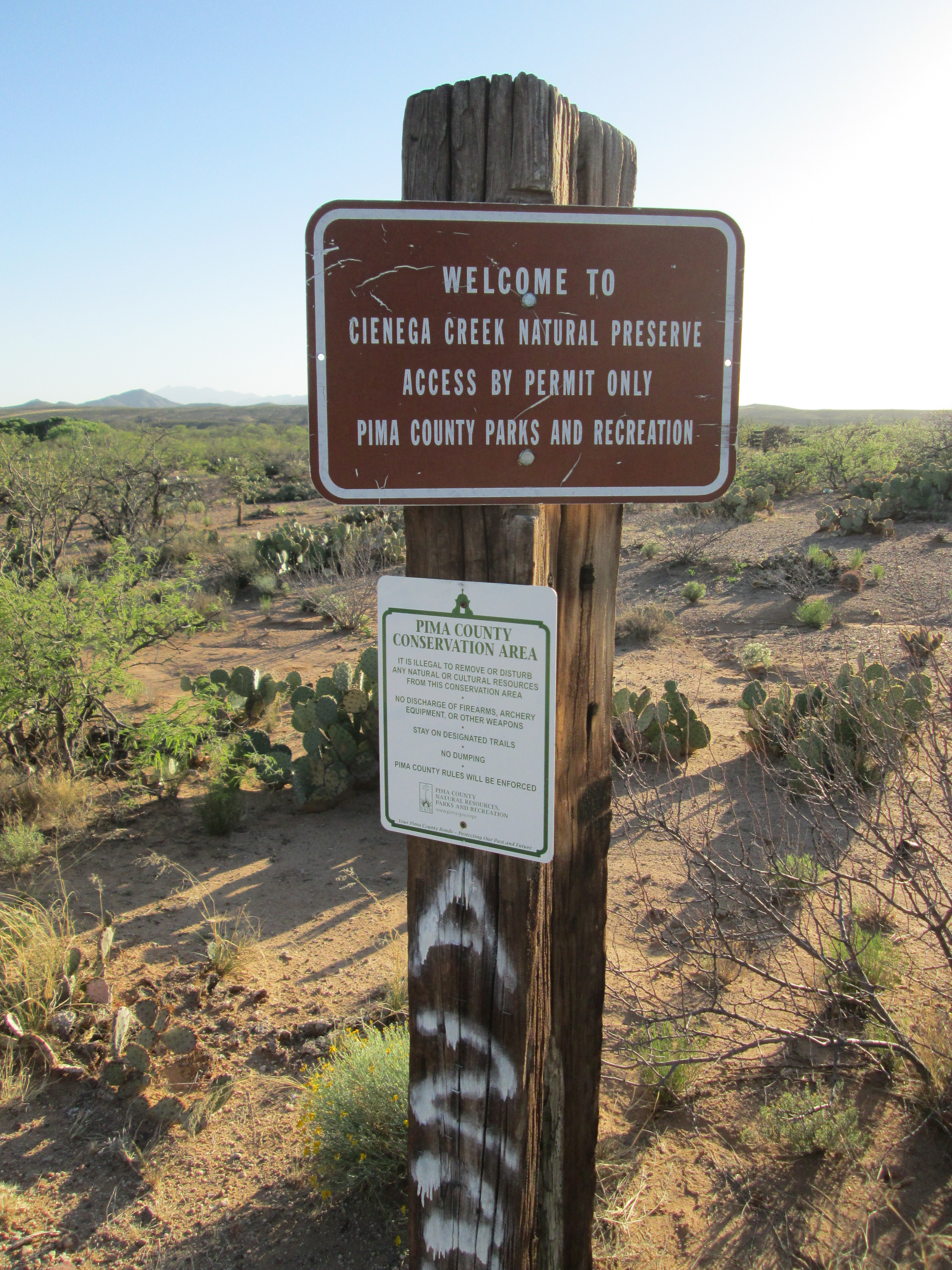
Signs at the entrance to the Pantano Townsite Conservation Area.

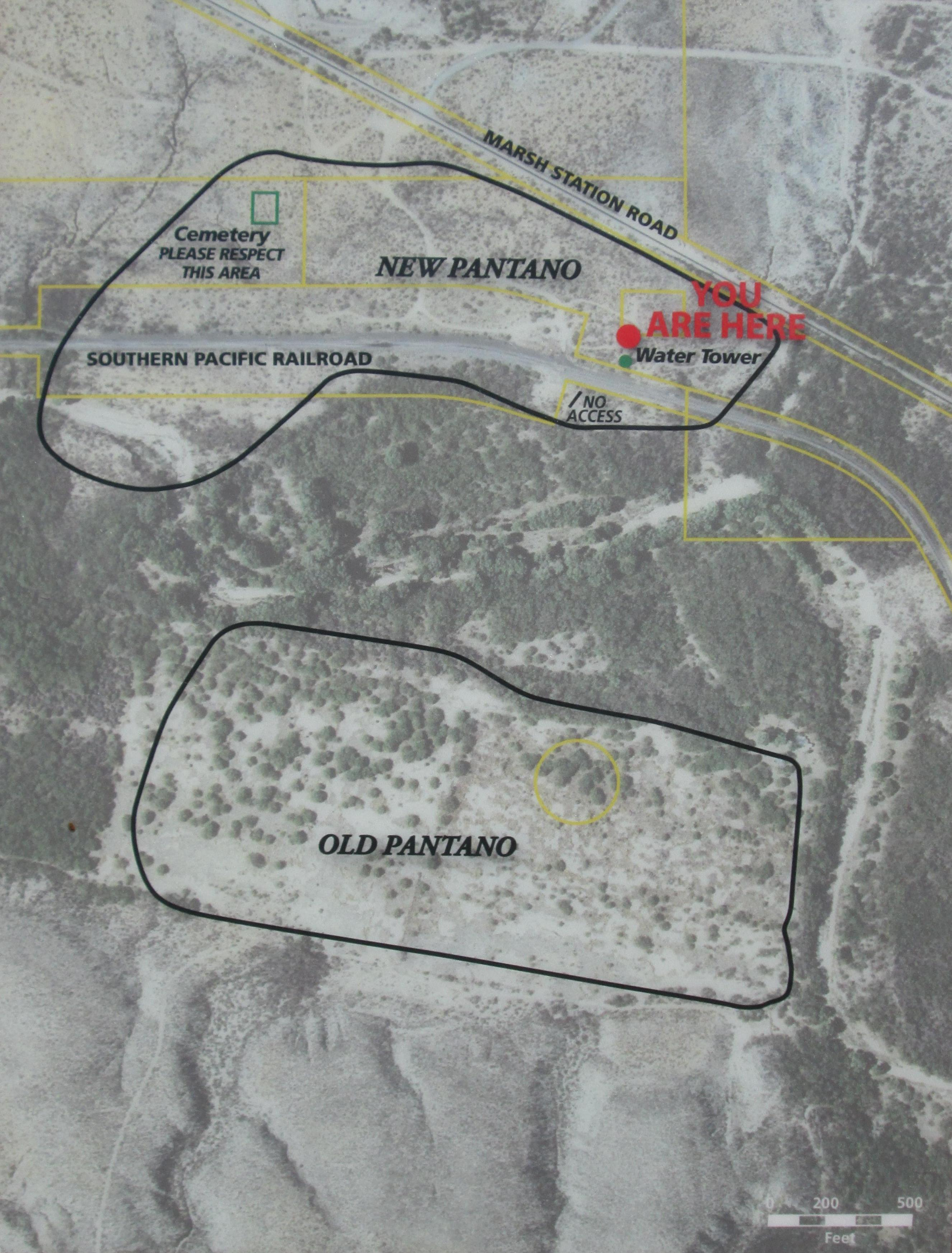
A map of the area.

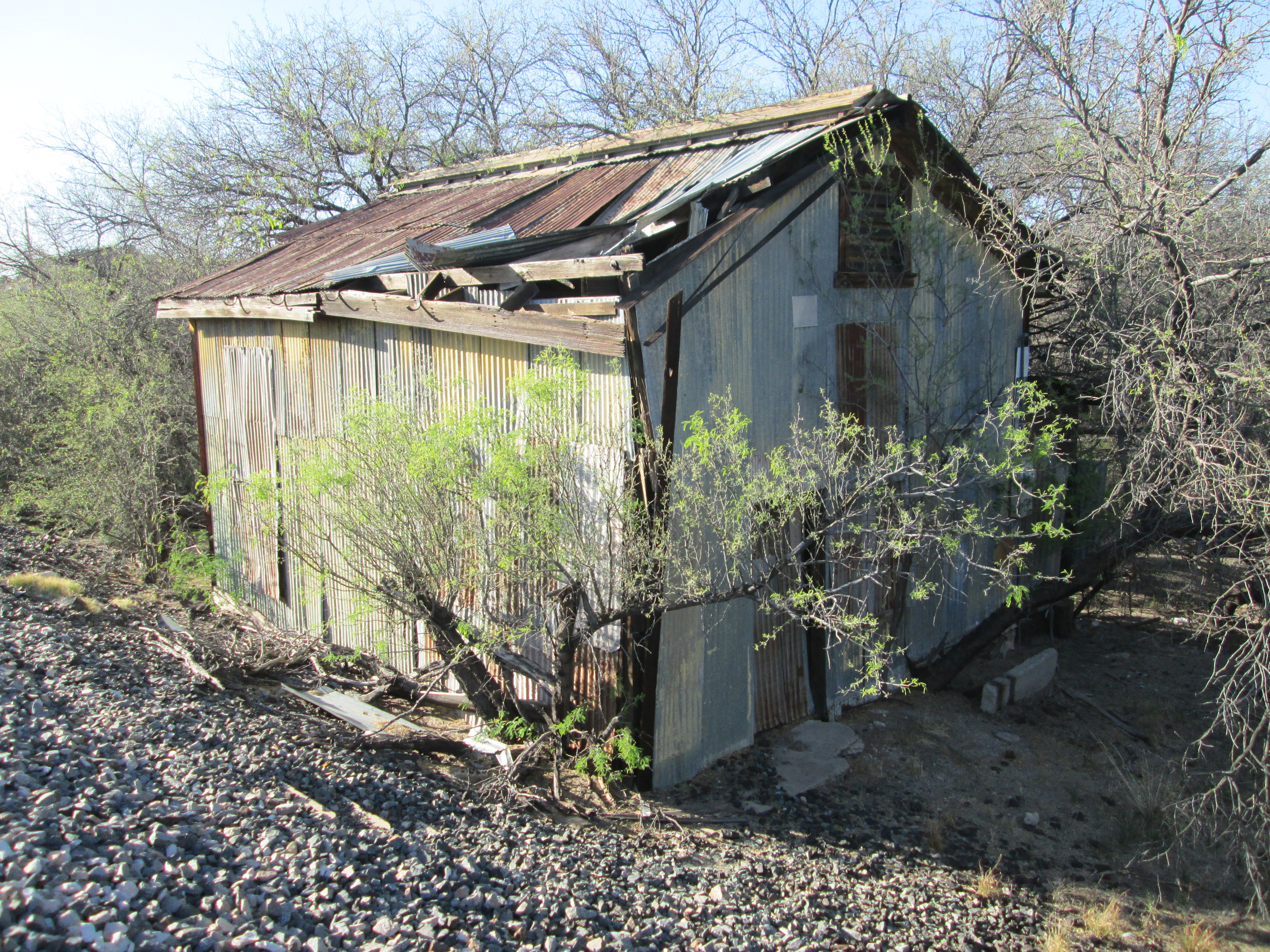
The front of the old pumphouse.

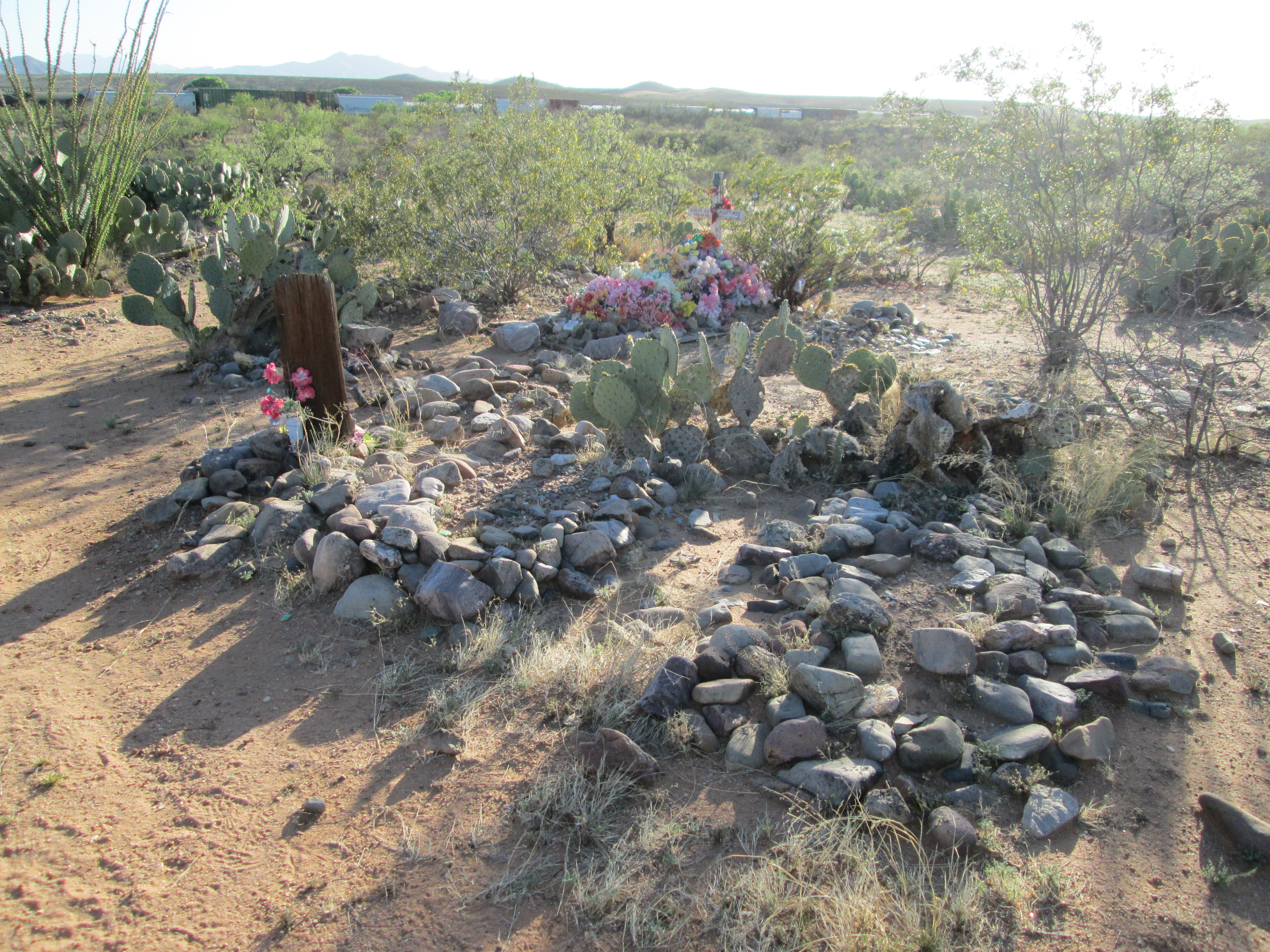
The Pantano Cemetery.

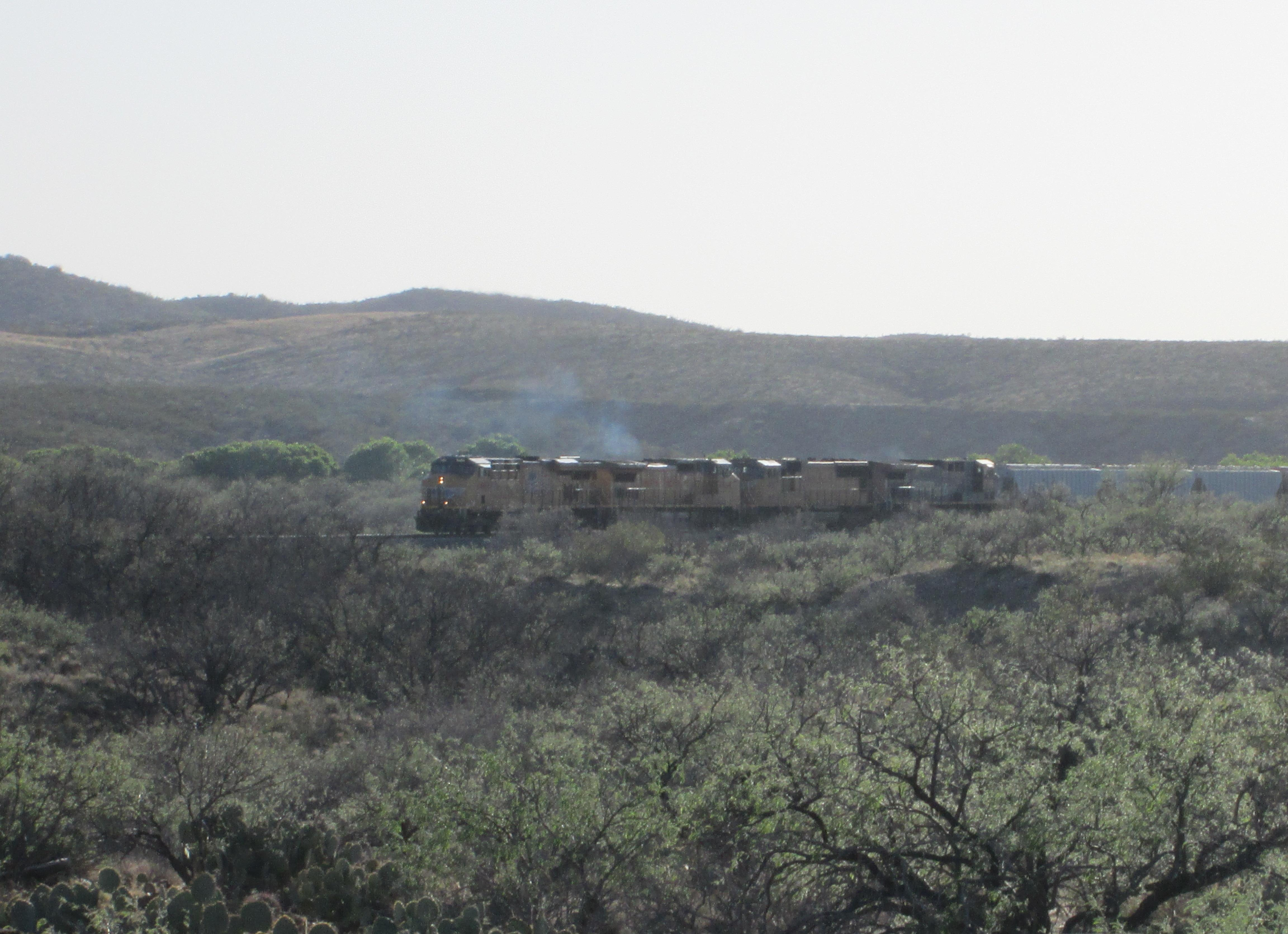
A Union Pacific train passing through the site of Pantano in 2014.

== See also ==
- Empire Ranch
- List of ghost towns in Arizona
