= Gadsden Hotel =

United States historic place in Cochise County, Arizona

- U.S. National Register of Historic Places
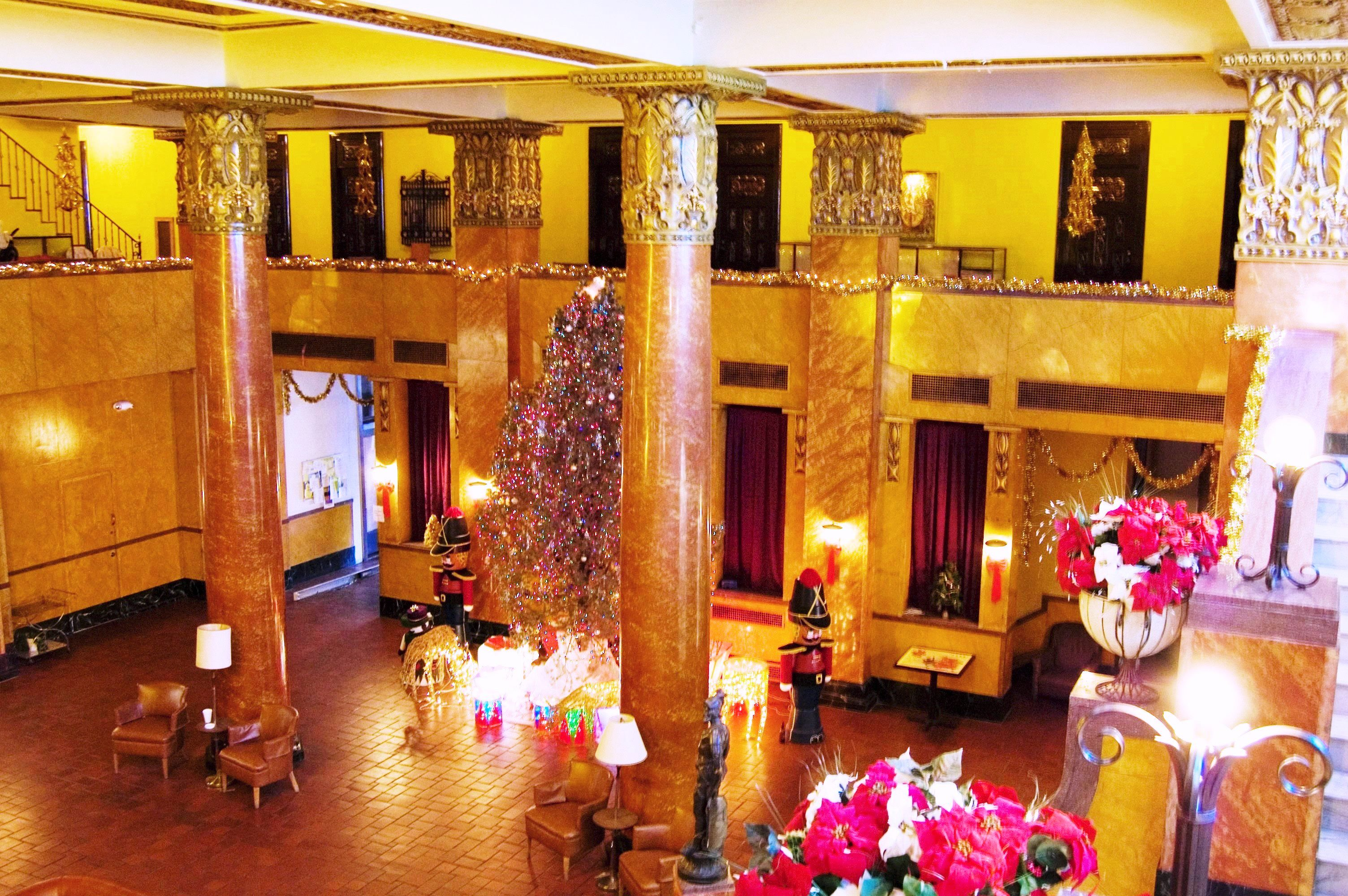
- Lobby, Gadsden Hotel

- Location within Arizona Location within the United States
- Location: 1046 G. Ave., Douglas, Arizona
- Coordinates: 31°20′43″N 109°33′15″W
- Built: 1907
- Architect: Trost & Trost
- NRHP reference No.: 76000371
- Added to NRHP: July 30, 1976

The Gadsden Hotel is a historic hotel in Douglas, Arizona. It was listed on the U.S. National Register of Historic Places in 1976. The hotel is owned by Bright Brains Hospitality

== History ==
The hotel opened in 1907. Named for the Gadsden Purchase, the stately five-story, 160-room hotel became a home away from home for cattlemen, ranchers, miners, and businessmen. The hotel was leveled by fire and rebuilt in 1929 by architect from El Paso Henry Trost. The Gadsden's spacious main lobby is majestically set with a solid white Italian marble staircase and four soaring marble columns. A stained glass window mural of the Southwest Desert by 5th generation artisan Ralph Baker, who studied under Louis Comfort Tiffany, extends forty-two feet across one wall of the massive mezzanine. A large oil painting by Audley Dean Nicols is just below the Tiffany-style window. The hotel's vaulted stained glass skylights run the full length of the lobby.

== In popular culture ==
The hotel is said to be haunted, especially in Room 333, and has been in "ghost" shows on television, such as an episode of Sightings in 1995. The Gadsden Hotel has also been in several movies, including The Life and Times of Judge Roy Bean with Paul Newman, Terminal Velocity with Charlie Sheen and Nastassja Kinski, and Ruby Jean and Joe with Tom Selleck.

The Gadsden was featured on Hotel Impossible on August 26, 2013. The hotel was turned over to a management company which renovated the first floor in 2013 and completed renovation of second-floor guest rooms in March 2014. Third-floor rooms were "dressed up" but not fully renovated and are now marketed as the "Historic Rooms".

== Notable guests ==
- Thornton Wilder, whose overnight stay in May 1962 for a car repair extended to two months—he liked both the hotel and the area.
- Effie Anderson Smith, known during her lifetime as The Dean of Arizona Women Artists, stayed at the Gadsden Hotel frequently during the 1930s. She resided in the hotel during the 1940s and completed several paintings there, including a view of the Swisshelms as seen from her room at the Gadsden. One of her paintings of the Grand Canyon hung in the lobby of the Gadsden Hotel for 11 years.
- Eleanor Roosevelt.
