= Douglas, Arizona Port of Entry =

Border crossing between Mexico and the U.S.

Douglas Arizona Port of Entry
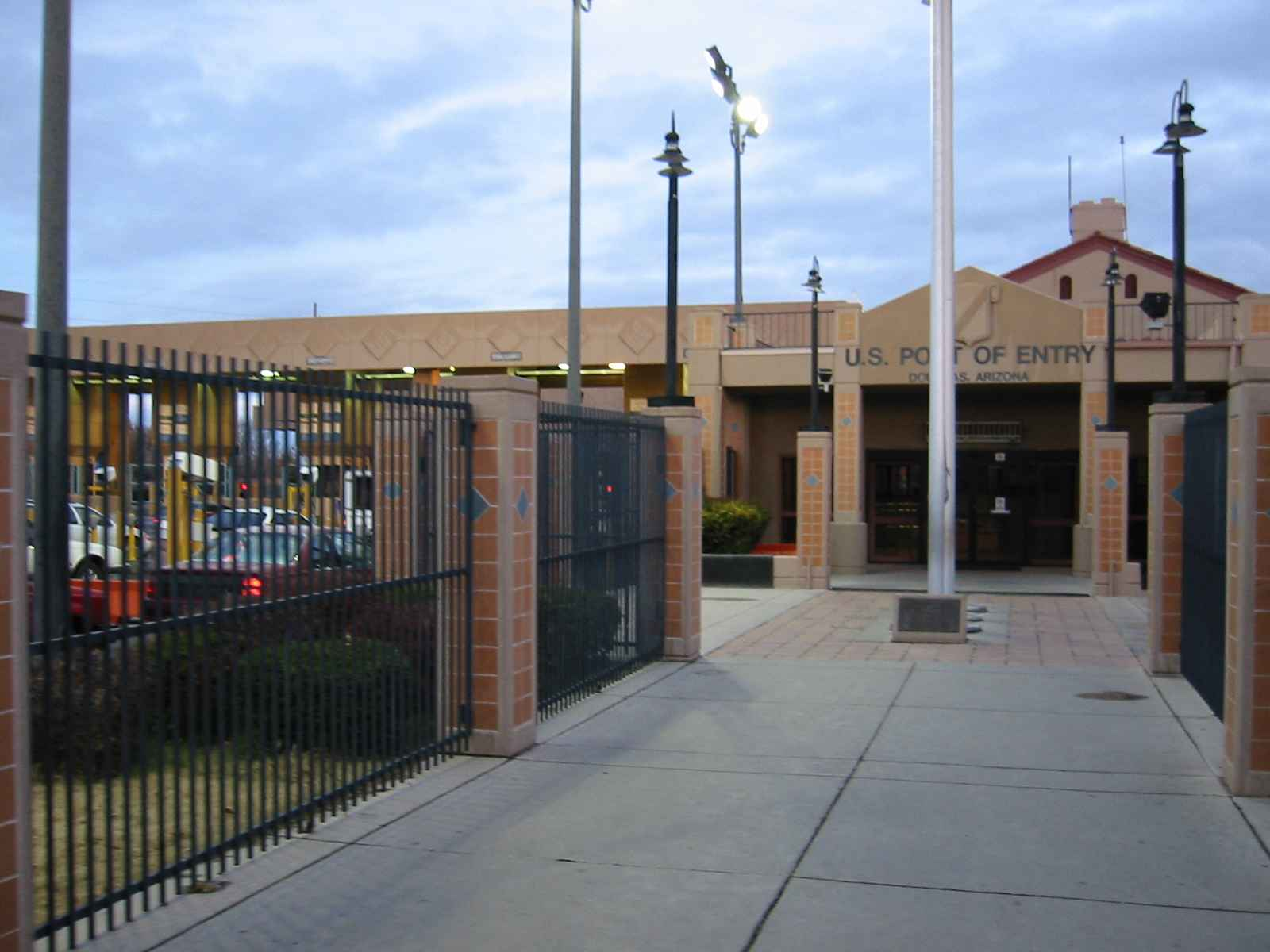
- Douglas Arizona Port of Entry, December 2001

Location
- Country: United States
- Location: First Street and Pan American Avenue, Douglas, Arizona 85607
- Coordinates: 31.334679°N 109.560374°W

Details
- Opened: 1914

Statistics
- 2025 Cars: 115,901
- 2025 Trucks: 2,071
- Pedestrians: 83,516

Website
- https://www.cbp.gov/about/contact/ports/douglas-arizona-2601
- U.S. Inspection Station-Douglas, Arizona
- U.S. National Register of Historic Places
- MPS: U.S. Border Inspection Stations MPS
- NRHP reference No.: 14000242
- Added to NRHP: May 22, 2014

The Douglas, Arizona Port of Entry is a port of entry on the Mexico–United States border. It connects Douglas, Arizona with Agua Prieta, Sonora. It is near the southern terminus of U.S. Route 191 in Arizona and the northern terminus of Mexican Federal Highway 17, which connect the towns of Douglas and Agua Prieta to their respective national highway networks.

It has been in existence since about 1914. The current border inspection station was built in 1933, was significantly renovated and expanded by the General Services Administration in 1993, and was listed on the U.S. National Register of Historic Places in 2014. The crossing is open 24 hours per day, 7 days per week. In 2015, this facility was renamed the "Raul Hector Castro Port of Entry", after former Arizona Governor Raúl Héctor Castro.

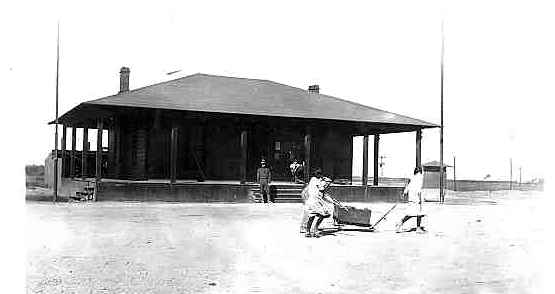
Original Douglas, Arizona border inspection station, as seen in 1916

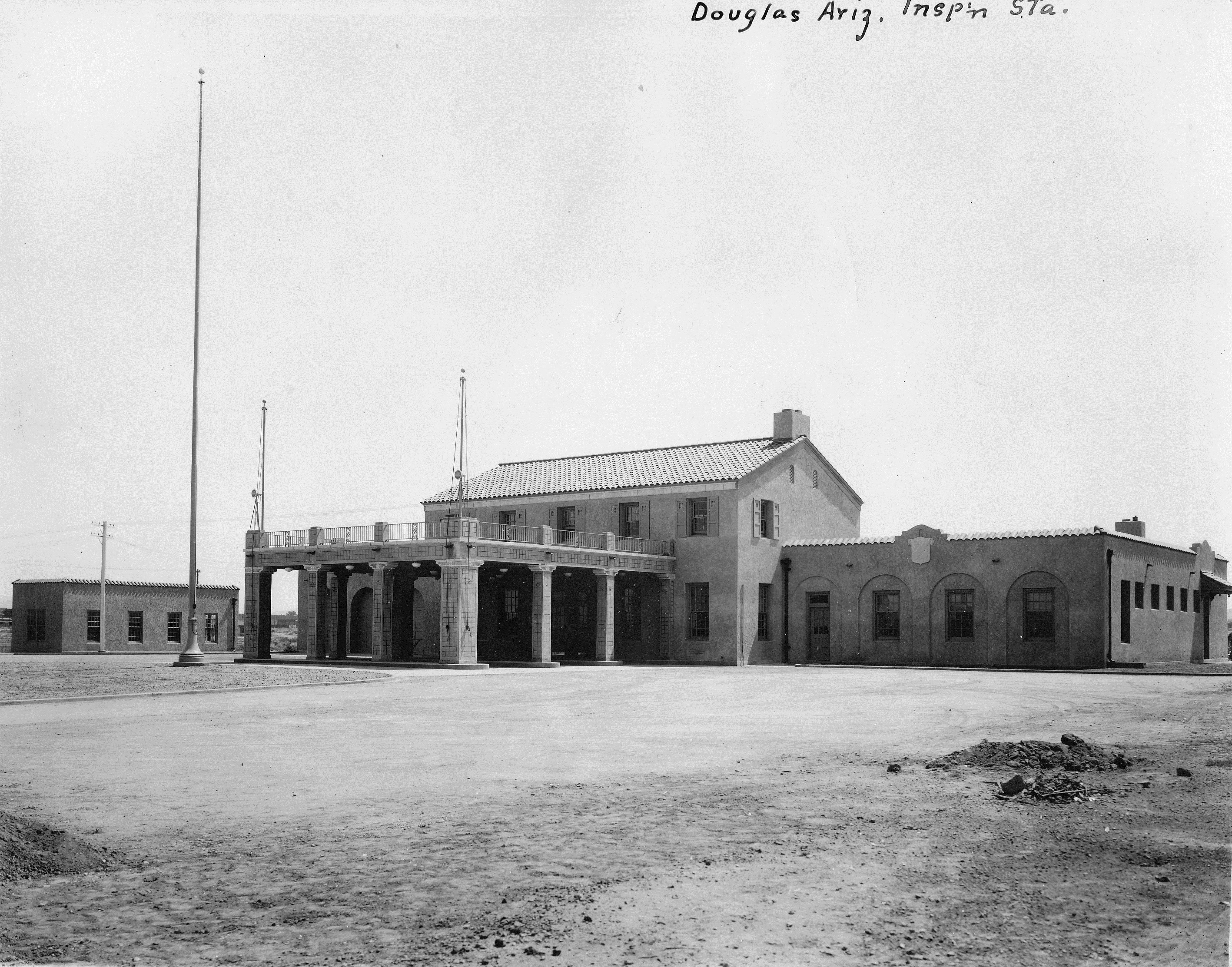
Douglas, Arizona border station as seen in 1933

== See also ==
- List of Mexico–United States border crossings
