= M. Jenea Sanchez =

American artist

- Born: 1985 (age 40–41); Douglas, Arizona, United States
- Education: Arizona State University
- Known for: Photography, Video, Textiles, Performance Art
- Movement: Border Art/Frontera
- Spouse: Robert Uribe

M. Jenea Sanchez (born 1985) is a Mexican-American artist, photographer, and educator. She co-founded the nonprofit arts organization Border Arts Corridor.

== Biography ==
Sanchez was born in 1985 and raised in Douglas, Arizona, and nearby Agua Prieta, in the state of Sonora, Mexico. Her mother was born in Mexico, and Sanchez was born in the United States. She received her Master of Fine Arts degree from Arizona State University (ASU) in 2011. Her work is centered around the intertwinement of these two geopolitical settings, and explores different modes of the "domesticana" expression.

=== Advocacy and education ===
In her hometown of Douglas, Sanchez has taught photography at Cochise College and graphic design at a local high school. Sanchez co-founded Border Arts Corridor (BAC), based in Douglas, with her husband, Robert Uribe, in 2015.

=== Art ===
Sanchez thinks of her home as a site for art making. She works in both Mexico and the United States. She considers the community in these landscapes and sustainability through crafting and harvesting from the environment. In an interview with Kent State University in fall of 2020 she says, "I reflect on my family and the people who came and walked the deserts before me. How did I get to this place and moment with this privilege?” Sanchez has exhibited her work at the Scottsdale Museum of Contemporary Art and the University of Arizona Museum of Art. She has frequently collaborated with artists who also work on the border of Mexico, such as her fellow ASU alum Gabriela Muñoz. Together they bring different approaches to processes and have been collaborators since graduate school. They have created large-scale installations centered on women, identity, and the borderlands, and produced Caldo de Pollo in 2020, a video and installation on foodways and shot with their families and members of DouglaPrieta Trabajan, a woman-run collective based in Agua Prieta, Mexico. Sanchez also photographed women of DouglaPrieta in her 2017 portrait series, The Mexican Women’s Post Apocalyptic Survival Guide in the Southwest, and received a Research and Development grant from the Arizona Commission on the Arts for her digital media work with and about the collective. According to Sanchez, the women of DouglaPrieta have determination that is "representative of millions of women around the world who face extreme oppression and poverty."

== Selected awards and distinctions ==
- National Association of Latino Arts and Culture’s Leadership Institute
- Mellon-Fronteridades Creative Scholar

== See also ==
- Ecofeminist art
- Ecological art
- Environmental art
- Environmental sculpture
- Site-specific art
