= Douglas, Arizona =

City in Cochise County, Arizona

Douglas
- City
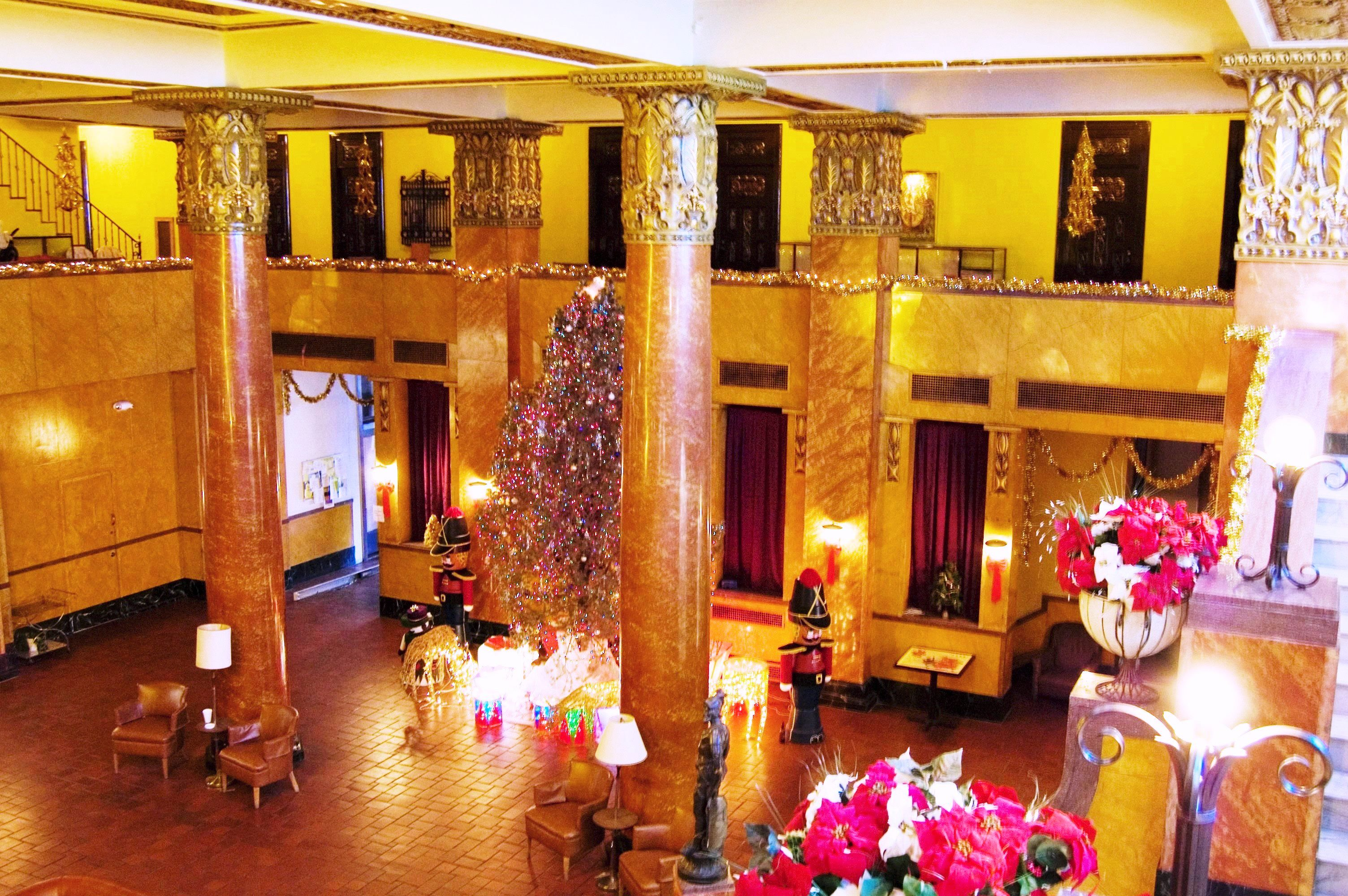
- Lobby of Gadsden Hotel, Douglas

- Flag

- Location of Douglas in Cochise County, Arizona

- Location in the United States
- Coordinates: 31°20′42″N 109°32′29″W
- Country: United States
- State: Arizona
- County: Cochise
- Incorporated: May 15, 1905

Government
  - Type: Council-manager
  - Body: Douglas City Council
  - Mayor: Jose Grijalva
  - Vice Mayor: Margaret Morales
  - City Manager: Ana Urquijo
  - City Council: List: • Danya Acosta; • Michael Baldenegro; • Jose Grijalva; • Donald C. Huish; • Mitch Lindemann; • Margaret Morales; • Ray Shelton

Area
  - Total: 9.98 sq mi (25.85 km^{2})
  - Land: 9.98 sq mi (25.85 km^{2})
  - Water: 0 sq mi (0.00 km^{2})
- Elevation: 4,032 ft (1,229 m)

Population (2020)
  - Total: 16,534
  - Density: 1,656.9/sq mi (639.72/km^{2})
- Time zone: UTC-7 (MST (no DST))
- ZIP codes: 85607, 85608, 85655
- Area code: 520
- FIPS code: 04-20050
- GNIS feature ID for the City of Douglas: 2410349
- Website: www.douglasaz.gov

Douglas is a city in Cochise County, Arizona, United States, that lies in the north-west to south-east running Sulphur Springs Valley. Douglas has a border crossing with Mexico at Agua Prieta and a history of mining.

The population was 16,531 in the 2020 Census.

== History ==
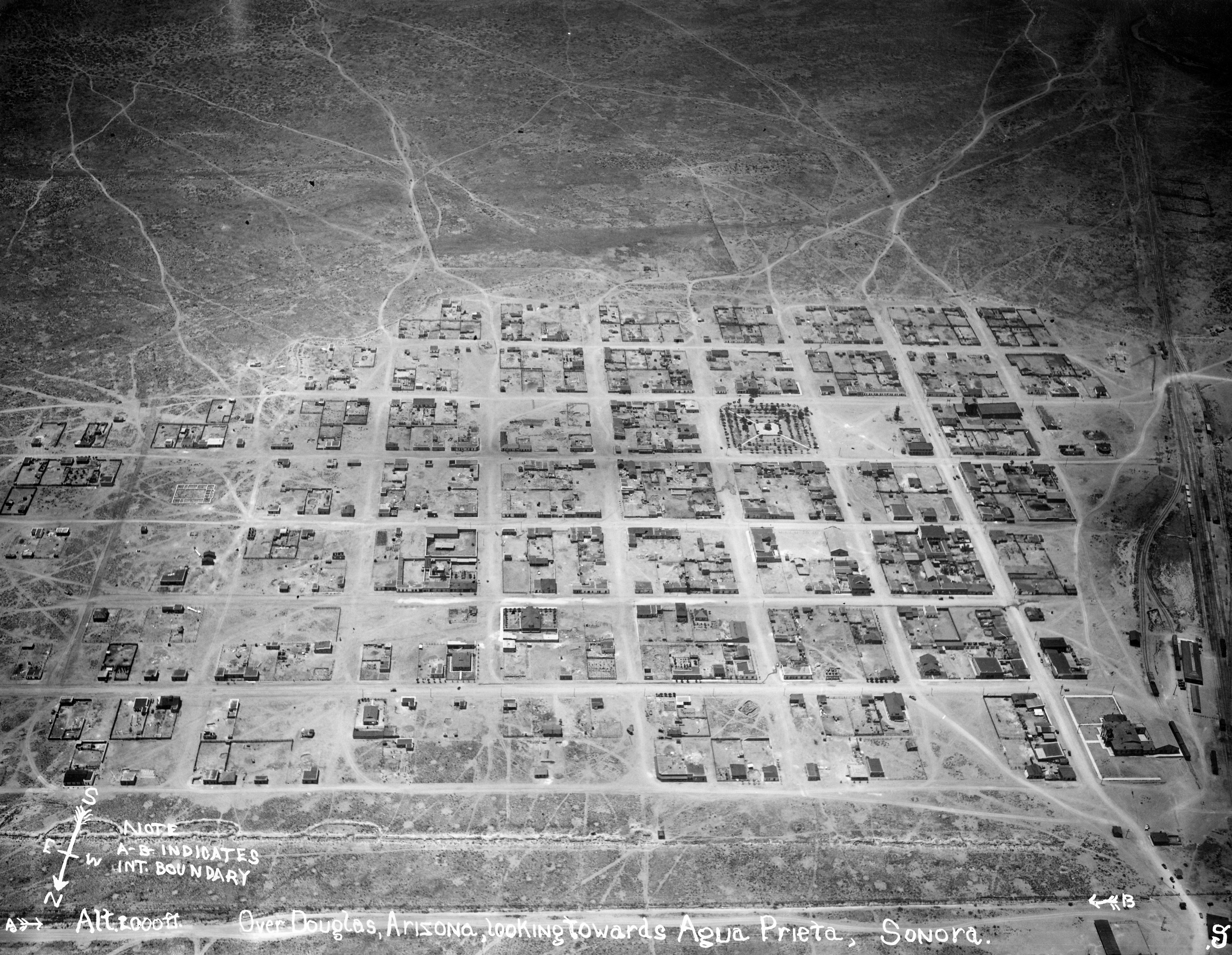
Douglas in the 1940s

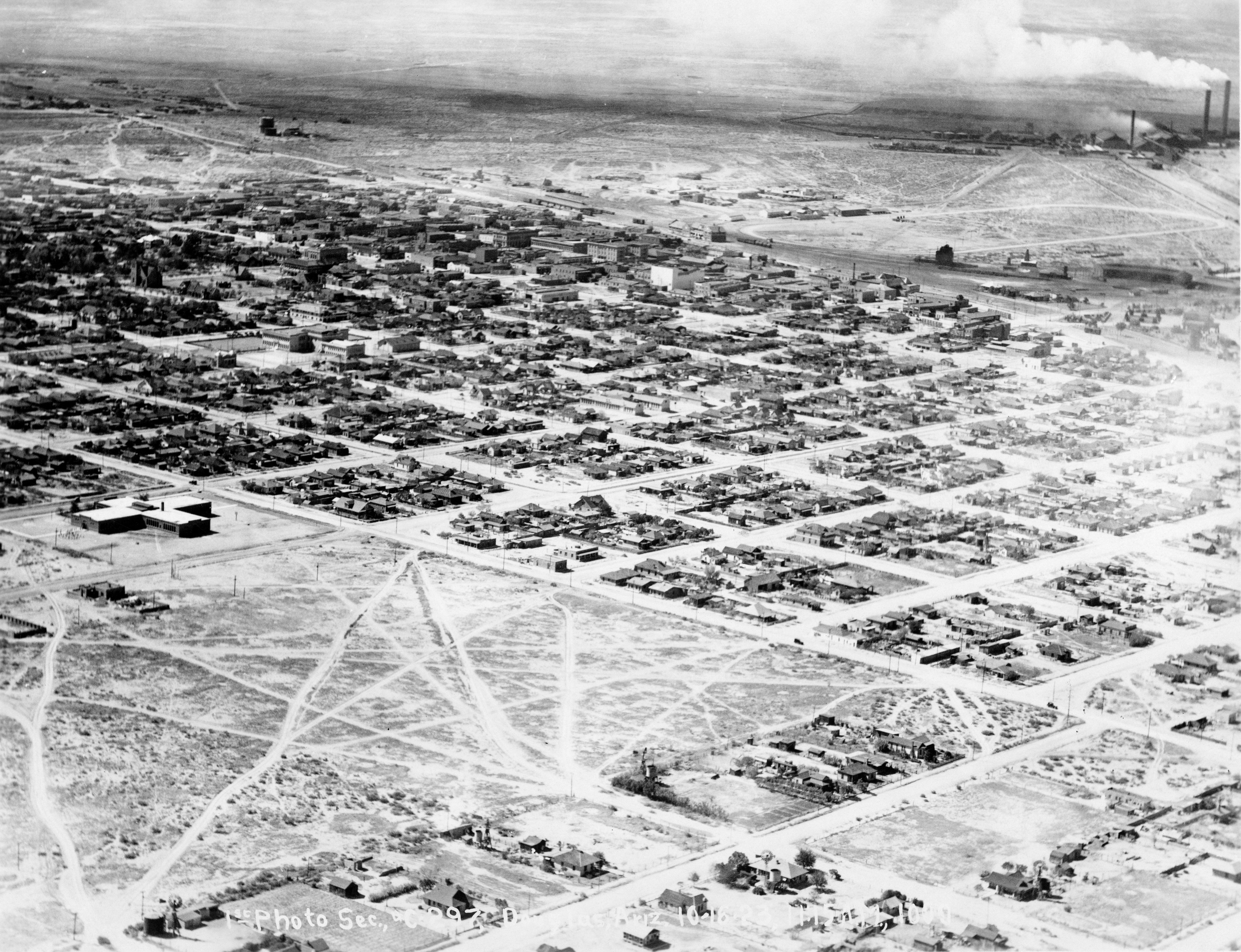
Douglas in the 1940s

The Douglas area was first settled by the Spanish in the 18th century. Presidio de San Bernardino was established in 1776 and abandoned in 1780. It was located a few miles east of present-day Douglas. The United States Army established Camp San Bernardino in the latter half of the 19th century near the presidio, and in 1910 Camp Douglas was built next to the town.

Douglas was founded as an American smelter town, to treat the copper ores of nearby Bisbee, Arizona. The town is named after mining pioneer Dr. James Douglas and was incorporated in 1905. Two copper smelters operated at the site. The Calumet and Arizona Company Smelter was built in 1902. The Copper Queen operated in Douglas from 1904 until 1931, when the Phelps Dodge Corporation purchased the Calumet and Arizona Company and took over their smelter. The Calumet and Arizona smelter then became the Douglas Reduction Works. Douglas was the site of the Phelps-Dodge Corporation Douglas Reduction Works until its closure in 1987. The smoke stacks of the smelter were not taken down until January 13, 1991. The town was the site of the Arizona Copper Mine Strike of 1983.

The "Cowboys Home Saloon" was the location of the fatal shooting of bar owner Lorenzo "Lon" Bass. The accused was Arizona Ranger William W. Webb. The date was February 8, 1903.

In 1916, the Mexican revolutionary leader Pancho Villa threatened to attack Douglas, believing Americans responsible for his defeat at the Second Battle of Agua Prieta.

On June 23, 1926, missing evangelist Aimee Semple McPherson was found collapsed near a road at the adjacent Mexican town of Agua Prieta. She was driven into Douglas and told a story of kidnap, torture and escape as she convalesced at Calumet Hospital. There, large crowds gathered, anxious to see the famous Canadian-American celebrity minister. She had earlier disappeared from a beach near Los Angeles and was believed drowned. For a period of several weeks, Douglas enjoyed a brisk tourist boom as police, reporters and others visited the town and the nearby desert to investigate her story. The Los Angeles Times wrote, "Mrs. McPherson put Douglas square on the map and the citizens here appear grateful that it was in Douglas she sought refuge."

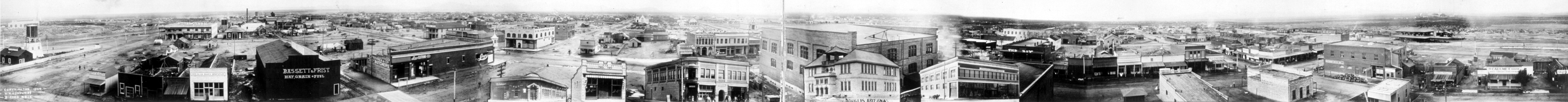
Panoramic view in 1904

In 1989, the Sinaloa Cartel dug a 300-foot (91-metre) tunnel between a house in Agua Prieta to a warehouse located in Douglas that it used to smuggle drugs across the international border. It was discovered in May 1990. Following its discovery, the Cartel refocused their smuggling operations towards Tijuana and Otay Mesa, San Diego where it acquired a warehouse in 1992. Other tunnels would also later be built in Arizona including sites at Naco and Nogales.

The town has been physically divided from Agua Prieta with a tall border wall built under President George W. Bush.

== Geography ==
Douglas is located near the southeastern corner of Arizona on the U.S.-Mexico border, across from the city of Agua Prieta, Sonora.

U.S. Route 191 leads north from Douglas 69 miles (111 km) to Interstate 10 near Willcox. Arizona State Route 80 leads west 26 miles (42 km) to Bisbee and northeast 80 miles (130 km) to Interstate 10 in New Mexico.

=== Climate ===
Douglas has a semi-arid steppe climate, which is cooler and wetter than a typical arid climate classification. In the winter months, Douglas averages in the mid to upper 60s °F (17–21 °C), with both January and February averaging daily highs of 64 °F (18 °C). Lows typically settle just below the freezing mark on a majority of nights, but it is not uncommon to see temperatures tumble below 25 °F (−4 °C) on some winter nights.

On the other hand, in the summer months, highs average between 90 and 100 °F (32 and 38 °C), with the month of June being the hottest with an average daytime high of 97 °F (36 °C). Nighttime lows for the summer months remain in the upper 50s and mid 60s °F (14–18 °C) for the duration of the season. June and July typically see 6 inches (150 mm) or more of combined rainfall, which brings the average annual precipitation for Douglas to about 14 inches (360 mm).

Douglas' all-time highest recorded temperature is 111 °F (44 °C) which was reached in July 1905. The all-time low temperature was −7 °F (−22 °C), which occurred in January 1913.

Climate data for Douglas, Arizona (DUG), elevation: 4,098 feet (1,249 m), 1991–2020 normals, extremes 1948–present
Month	Jan	Feb	Mar	Apr	May	Jun	Jul	Aug	Sep	Oct	Nov	Dec	Year
Record high °F (°C)	82 (28)	86 (30)	92 (33)	99 (37)	105 (41)	110 (43)	109 (43)	106 (41)	102 (39)	96 (36)	88 (31)	82 (28)	110 (43)
Mean maximum °F (°C)	74.0 (23.3)	78.2 (25.7)	84.5 (29.2)	89.8 (32.1)	98.0 (36.7)	104.1 (40.1)	102.9 (39.4)	99.5 (37.5)	96.9 (36.1)	92.0 (33.3)	82.3 (27.9)	75.4 (24.1)	105.1 (40.6)
Mean daily maximum °F (°C)	62.2 (16.8)	65.7 (18.7)	72.1 (22.3)	79.1 (26.2)	87.3 (30.7)	96.0 (35.6)	93.6 (34.2)	91.5 (33.1)	88.8 (31.6)	81.5 (27.5)	70.7 (21.5)	61.4 (16.3)	79.2 (26.2)
Daily mean °F (°C)	45.1 (7.3)	48.6 (9.2)	54.2 (12.3)	60.5 (15.8)	68.8 (20.4)	77.9 (25.5)	79.3 (26.3)	77.7 (25.4)	73.6 (23.1)	64.0 (17.8)	52.8 (11.6)	44.8 (7.1)	62.3 (16.8)
Mean daily minimum °F (°C)	28.0 (−2.2)	31.5 (−0.3)	36.3 (2.4)	41.9 (5.5)	50.2 (10.1)	59.7 (15.4)	65.1 (18.4)	63.8 (17.7)	58.4 (14.7)	46.5 (8.1)	35.0 (1.7)	28.2 (−2.1)	45.4 (7.4)
Mean minimum °F (°C)	16.6 (−8.6)	19.9 (−6.7)	24.0 (−4.4)	29.7 (−1.3)	39.5 (4.2)	50.2 (10.1)	60.2 (15.7)	58.9 (14.9)	50.0 (10.0)	34.0 (1.1)	21.6 (−5.8)	16.3 (−8.7)	13.4 (−10.3)
Record low °F (°C)	6 (−14)	0 (−18)	13 (−11)	21 (−6)	29 (−2)	40 (4)	53 (12)	51 (11)	36 (2)	19 (−7)	11 (−12)	−4 (−20)	−4 (−20)
Average precipitation inches (mm)	0.63 (16)	0.56 (14)	0.50 (13)	0.11 (2.8)	0.23 (5.8)	0.49 (12)	3.07 (78)	2.91 (74)	1.27 (32)	0.62 (16)	0.67 (17)	0.77 (20)	11.83 (300)
Average snowfall inches (cm)	0.1 (0.25)	0.0 (0.0)	0.1 (0.25)	0.0 (0.0)	0.0 (0.0)	0.0 (0.0)	0.0 (0.0)	0.0 (0.0)	0.0 (0.0)	0.0 (0.0)	0.1 (0.25)	0.1 (0.25)	0.4 (1)
Average precipitation days (≥ 0.01 in)	4.1	4.2	3.0	1.3	1.4	3.1	13.6	12.2	5.4	3.4	2.9	4.0	58.6
Average snowy days (≥ 0.1 in)	0.2	0.0	0.1	0.0	0.0	0.0	0.0	0.0	0.0	0.0	0.1	0.2	0.6
Source: NOAA

== Demographics ==
Historical population
Census	Pop.	Note	%±
1910	6,437		—
1920	9,916		54.0%
1930	9,828		−0.9%
1940	8,623		−12.3%
1950	9,442		9.5%
1960	11,925		26.3%
1970	12,462		4.5%
1980	13,058		4.8%
1990	12,822		−1.8%
2000	14,312		11.6%
2010	17,378		21.4%
2020	16,534		−4.9%
U.S. Decennial Census

=== 2020 census ===
As of the 2020 census, Douglas had a population of 16,534. The median age was 34.3 years. 26.3% of residents were under the age of 18 and 15.1% of residents were 65 years of age or older. For every 100 females there were 111.7 males, and for every 100 females age 18 and over there were 115.8 males age 18 and over.

86.1% of residents lived in urban areas, while 13.9% lived in rural areas.

There were 4,972 households in Douglas, of which 41.0% had children under the age of 18 living in them. Of all households, 40.2% were married-couple households, 18.2% were households with a male householder and no spouse or partner present, and 36.5% were households with a female householder and no spouse or partner present. About 25.1% of all households were made up of individuals and 13.4% had someone living alone who was 65 years of age or older.

There were 5,669 housing units, of which 12.3% were vacant. The homeowner vacancy rate was 2.4% and the rental vacancy rate was 8.3%.

Racial composition as of the 2020 census
Race	Number	Percent
White	6,628	40.1%
Black or African American	391	2.4%
American Indian and Alaska Native	270	1.6%
Asian	121	0.7%
Native Hawaiian and Other Pacific Islander	19	0.1%
Some other race	4,357	26.4%
Two or more races	4,748	28.7%
Hispanic or Latino (of any race)	14,126	85.4%

=== 2010 census ===
As of the census of 2010, there were 17,509 people, 4,986 households, and 3,662 families residing in the city. The population density was 1,750.9 inhabitants per square mile (676.0/km^{2}). There were 5,652 housing units at an average density of 565.2 per square mile (218.2/km^{2}). The racial makeup of the city was 68.2% white, 2.8% black or African-American, 1.7% American Indian or Alaska Native, 0.5% Asian, 0.1% Native Hawaiian or other Pacific Islander, 24.2% some other race, and 2.6% two or more races. 82.6% of the population were Hispanic or Latino of any race.

There were 4,986 households, out of which 45.9% had children under the age of 18 living with them, 42.9% were headed by married couples living together, 24.0% had a female householder with no husband present, and 26.6% were non-families. 23.5% of all households were made up of individuals, and 11.3% were someone living alone who was 65 years of age or older. The average household size was 2.98, and the average family size was 3.56.

In the city, the age distribution of the population was 28.2% under the age of 18, 10.4% from 18 to 24, 28.2% from 25 to 44, 21.7% from 45 to 64, and 11.5% who were 65 years of age or older. The median age was 32.2 years. For every 100 females, there were 120.7 males. For every 100 females age 18 and over, there were 127.4 males.

=== 2008-2012 estimates ===
For the period 2008–12, the estimated median annual income for a household in the city was $28,548, and the median income for a family was $33,117. Male full-time workers had a median income of $25,853 versus $31,222 for females. The per capita income for the city was $13,376. About 25.1% of families and 30.2% of the population were below the poverty line, including 36.8% of those under age 18 and 29.0% of those age 65 or over.

== Cityscape ==
=== Arts and culture ===
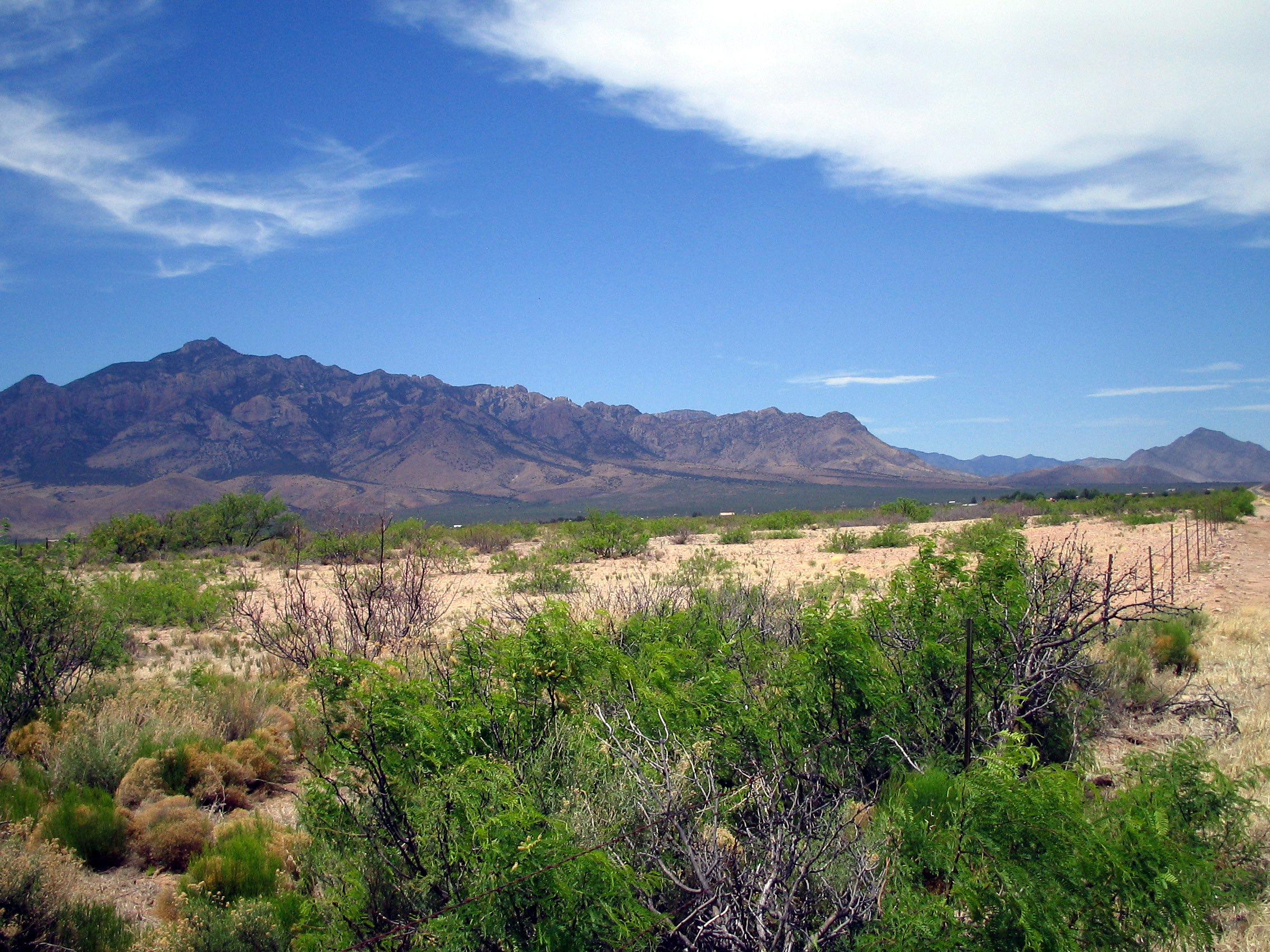
Chiricahua Mountains

Douglas is home to the historic Gadsden Hotel, which opened in 1907. Named for the Gadsden Purchase, the stately five-story, 160-room hotel became a home away from home for cattlemen, ranchers, miners, and businessmen. The hotel was leveled by fire and rebuilt in 1929. The Gadsden is listed on the National Register of Historic Places. The Gadsden's spacious main lobby is majestically set with a solid white Italian marble staircase and four soaring marble columns. A stained glass window mural by 5th generation Artisan Ralph Baker, who studied under Louis Comfort Tiffany, extends 42 feet (13 m) across the eastern wall of the massive mezzanine. The mural of the Southwest Desert is an adaptive work of art that changes colors and depths throughout the day and seasons including the sunrising on the horizon of the mural. An impressive oil painting by Audley Dean Nicols is just below the Tiffany-style window. Vaulted stained glass skylights run the full length of the lobby.

The San Bernardino Ranch, 14 miles east of the town of Douglas, was originally established in Mexico and covered thousands of acres. The new US-Mexico border of the Gadsden Purchase sliced through the ranch, thus reducing its US size. Today the ranch is called "Slaughter Ranch," named after the lawman John Slaughter, who owned the ranch in the late 19th century and early 20th century.

The El Paso and Southwestern Railroad depot was an important train station. It transported copper to large manufacturing concerns in the east. The depot is considered one of the finest examples of railway architecture of the early 20th century. The building is now used for the Douglas police station and is just one of 400 buildings on the National Register of Historic Places in Douglas.

The Douglas Grand Theatre was built in 1919 and was the largest theater between Los Angeles and San Antonio. Ginger Rogers, Anna Pavlova and John Philip Sousa are some of the famous faces to have graced the theater's stage. It also housed a tea room, candy store and barbershop in its glory days. For several Halloweens the Grand Theater was used as a "Haunted House" attraction. Today (2009) the theater is undergoing reconstruction, using private donations of money, supplies and labor.

=== Cemeteries ===
The Douglas Jewish Cemetery was founded in 1904 near the Mexican border. It has nineteen recorded graves, and thirteen of the tombstones are not necessarily on the correct grave sites due to extensive vandalism. The cemetery was in use from 1912 to 1963. The cemetery was restored, re-fenced and cleaned in 1992 by students and numerous others. The cemetery is included in the State of Arizona of Historical Places.

== Government ==
Jose Grijalva is the 33rd Mayor of the city. He currently chairs the Finance Committee, overseeing the city's financial matters.

== Transportation ==
The city of Douglas operates Douglas Rides, which provides local transportation. The city also operates Cochice Connection, which provides connections between Douglas, Bisbee, and Sierra Vista. Private shuttle services connect Douglas with Tucson and Phoenix.

Douglas is connected to Agua Prieta by the Douglas, Arizona Port of Entry. Also, Douglas Airport is located here. There are no airline services at this airport.

== Education ==
=== Public schools ===
The Douglas Unified School District is responsible for public education. Schools include:

- Clawson Elementary School
- Douglas High School
- Faras Elementary School
- Joe Carlson Elementary School
- Paul H. Huber Middle School
- Sarah Marley Elementary School
- Stevenson Elementary School
- Ray Borane Middle School

=== Private schools ===
- CAS Elementary, Middle, and High School
- Loretto Catholic School
- Omega Alpha Academy K-12 Charter School (Charter schools are public schools.)

== Notable people ==
- Raúl Héctor Castro, first Hispanic Governor of Arizona (1975–1977), grew up in Douglas
- John D. Driggs, 50th mayor of Phoenix
- Manny Farber, stylist, film critic, and painter
- Evelyn Finley, actress and Hollywood stuntwoman
- Harold L. Humes (1926–1992), novelist and founder of The Paris Review literary magazine
- Stan Jones (1914–1963), musician
- Robert Krentz, rancher who was murdered in 2010 by a suspected undocumented immigrant.
- Gil Lefebvre (1910–1987), football player
- Lorna E. Lockwood, first female chief justice of a state supreme court
- Bill Melendez, animator, film producer, and film director; best known as the voice of Snoopy and Woodstock
- Mike Pagel, former NFL quarterback
- M. Jenea Sanchez, Mexican-American artist, photographer, and co-founder of the Border Arts Corridor
- Jack Lund Schofield, Nevada state legislator
- "Texas John" Slaughter, Cochise County Sheriff (1841–1922) and a champion for Arizona's statehood
- Effie Anderson Smith (1869–1955), impressionist painter of desert landscapes
- Robert Uribe, first Afro-Latino mayor of Douglas, serving from 2016 to 2020
- Thornton Wilder, Pulitzer Prize-winning playwright and novelist (He spent less than 2 years there in his 60s.)

== In popular culture ==
- The Life and Times of Judge Roy Bean (1972)
- Arizona Dream (1993)
- Pontiac Moon (1994)
- Terminal Velocity (1994)
