= Robert Uribe =

American politician

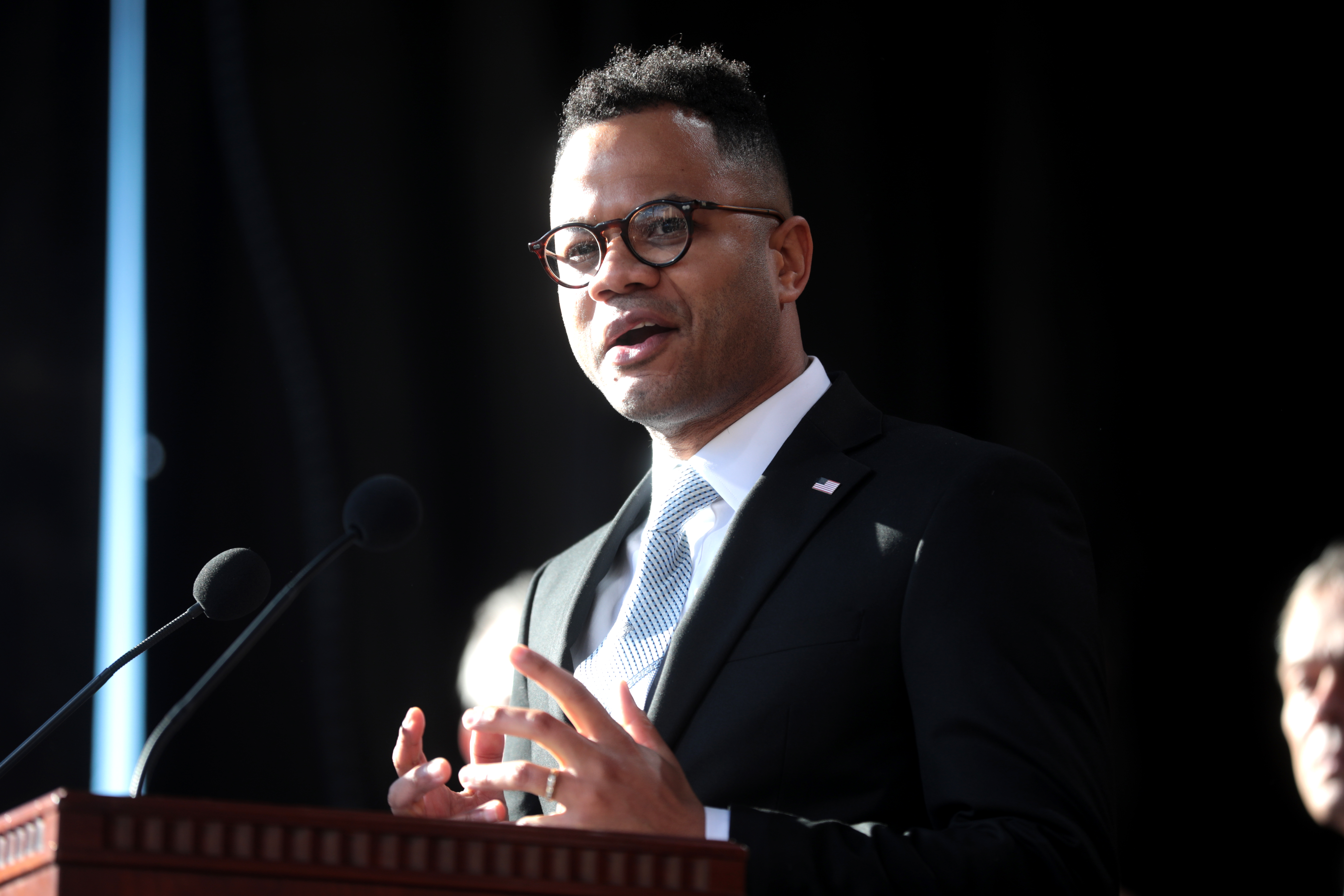

Mayor of Douglas, Arizona
- In office 2016–2020

Personal details
- Born: June 8, 1984 (age 42) Dominican Republic
- Spouse: M. Jenea Sanchez (m. 2010)

Robert Uribe (born June 8, 1984) is an American politician and community activist who served as the Mayor of Douglas, Arizona, from 2016 to 2020. He is the first Afro-Latino person elected to public office in Douglas, and the youngest mayor in the city's history at the time of his election.

== Early life and immigration ==
Robert Uribe was born on June 8, 1984, in the Dominican Republic. He immigrated to the United States with his mother and brother, becoming a U.S. citizen at the age of 13. He later worked as a youth educator in Manhattan, New York City, before relocating to Arizona in 2005.

In 2010, Uribe met Douglas-born artist M. Jenea Sanchez, whom he married that same year. He moved to Douglas in 2012. Prior to entering politics, Uribe and Sanchez co-owned Galiano's Café, a coffee shop in downtown Douglas that opened in 2012. The café won the 2017 Governor's Arts Award in the Small Business category, presented by Arizona Citizens for the Arts in partnership with the Office of the Governor. Uribe was later mentioned in Jessica Bruder's 2017 book Nomadland, which described him as among the entrepreneurs and artists who moved to Douglas amid affordable real estate prices.

== Political career ==
Uribe ran for mayor of Douglas, Arizona in 2016. He won the mayoral election by a margin of 24 votes — 1,149 to 1,125 — over opponent Luis Greer. He was sworn in at the June 8, 2016 city council meeting. According to Borderlore, his victory made him both the youngest and the first Afro-Latino mayor in Douglas history.

During his tenure, Uribe prioritized economic development along the U.S.–Mexico border, focusing on the revitalization of Douglas's downtown district, development of a Commercial Port of Entry, and expansion of the city's wastewater management plant. Uribe told the Associated Press that border communities could not afford to "contaminate immigration with tariffs," warning that Trump's trade threats were already deterring potential investors from Germany and China from setting up businesses in Douglas. Together with his wife, he co-founded the Border Arts Corridor (BAC), a binational arts organization connecting Douglas, Arizona with Agua Prieta, Sonora, Mexico. In 2018, Uribe welcomed the Arizona Diamondbacks to Douglas for the dedication of Erubiel Durazo Field, describing Douglas as "the greatest border community in Arizona." Uribe and his wife were profiled by Der Spiegel, Germany's largest news magazine, which described them as "die Obamas von der Grenze" (the Obamas of the Border). During visits to the Dominican Republic in 2017 and 2018, Uribe received multiple municipal recognitions across the country, including being named a distinguished guest by the Ayuntamiento del Distrito Nacional in a unanimous vote presided over by mayor David Collado, by the Alcaldía de Santo Domingo Oeste, and by the Ayuntamiento Municipal de San Juan de la Maguana via Resolution No. 01-2018.

In 2018, Uribe was selected as a fellow of the Transatlantic Inclusion Leaders Network (TILN), a highly competitive program co-sponsored by the German Marshall Fund of the United States, the United States Department of State, and the U.S. Helsinki Commission. He represented the United States at the annual workshop held in Brussels, Belgium, alongside emerging leaders from 26 countries across Europe and America.

In January 2019, Uribe was selected as Master of Ceremonies for the inauguration of Governor Doug Ducey for his second term at the Arizona State Capitol. Uribe, a Democrat, was chosen by the Republican governor to lead the bipartisan ceremony. In 2019, Uribe represented Douglas at the State Leadership Day conference in Washington, D.C., where he met with White House officials including the Vice President to advocate for Douglas's Commercial Port of Entry project.

In January 2019, a group of Douglas residents initiated a recall effort against Mayor Uribe, citing the city's high financial deficit and a lack of transparency. Petitioners collected more than the required 569 signatures to place the recall on the ballot. A judge later invalidated the petition due to procedural concerns.

== Personal life ==
Uribe is married to M. Jenea Sanchez, a Douglas-born visual artist. The couple have three children together.

== Bibliography ==
- Uribe, Robert (2026). Caribbean Son, American Mayor: How a Dominican Kid Became an American Mayor. Self-published.
