= Audley Dean Nicols =

American painter (1875–1941)

- Born: 22 September 1875; Sewickley, Pennsylvania, US
- Died: 13 November 1941 (aged 66); El Paso, Texas, US
- Resting place: Restlawn Memorial Park
- Education: Art Students League of New York
- Known for: Desert landscape painting
- Spouse: Mary Olivia Nicols née Mahoney
- Elected: Southern National Academy
- Patrons: Carl Wunderly; Louis Roy Hoard

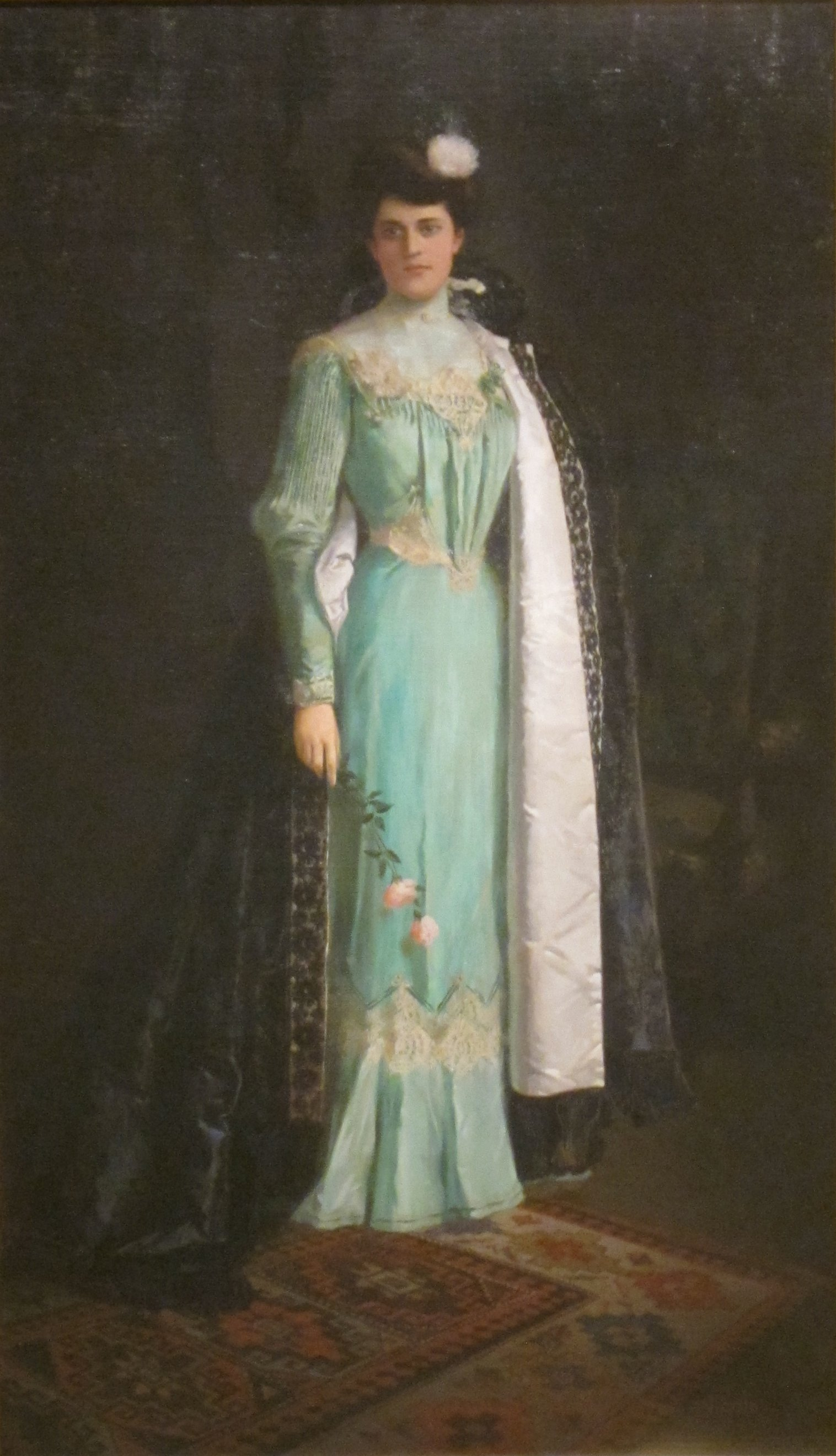
Alice Clyde Nicols (1902), El Paso Museum of Art

Audley Dean Nicols (22 September 1875–13 November 1941) was an American artist, illustrator and muralist. Born and raised in Sewickley, Pennsylvania; he studied in New York and Europe, and worked as an illustrator for various national magazines in the United States. He moved to El Paso, Texas in the early 1920s, where he painted desert landscapes of the American Southwest. Nicols achieved national recognition during his lifetime; his style and choice of subjects gathering followers who became known as the "Purple Mountain Painters".

== Life and career ==
Born in 1875 in Sewickley 12 miles (19 km) from Pittsburgh along the Ohio River, Audley Dean Nicols was the son of Parshall D. Nicols, an iron broker, and Elizabeth "Lizzie" Agnes McLaughlin, an art teacher. He had a sister, Alice Clyde Nicols, and two brothers, Verner, who died of the Spanish Flu, and Lowell, who was an art critic and an optical glass research chemist. His mother Lizzie, who had studied with painter George Hetzel and taught drawing and painting at the Steubenville Seminary, gave him his first art lessons.

After graduating from Sewickley High School in 1893, he went to New York to study under Harry Siddons Mowbray, Edwin Blashfield, and Kenyon Cox, at the Metropolitan Museum of Art and the Art Students League of New York. After further studies in Europe, Nicols started a career as a magazine illustrator, working for several publications including Collier's, McClure's, Cosmopolitan, Harper's, Scribner's, St. Nicholas Magazine, and The Burr McIntosh Monthly. After a period of convalescence at home due to surgical operations, he moved into oil painting, working from a studio in the Sewickley Valley Trust building. Some of his work from this earlier period includes murals in Pittsburgh public buildings and portraits. He painted Civil War General Alexander Hays in a portrait and in a now lost painting where he is shown dragging the Confederate flag from his horse. His work in oils began to get some recognition and in 1904, Nicols' painting A Reverie was accepted for the ninth Carnegie International Exhibition in Pittsburgh.

Nicols began visiting the Arizona desert and Texas from around 1912, permanently moving with his family to El Paso in 1922, due in part to health problems with an extrapulmonary tuberculosis contracted in his youth, and that made him walk with a limp. He lived in a rock house in Fort Boulevard at the foothills of the Franklin mountains, and since before his permanent move he went on long desert expeditions for plein air painting, first in the company of two Franciscan priests and later with a friend. His first work with of a desert subject was bought by breakfast cereal pioneer Charles W. Post in a Chicago gallery, sometime between 1912 and 1914.

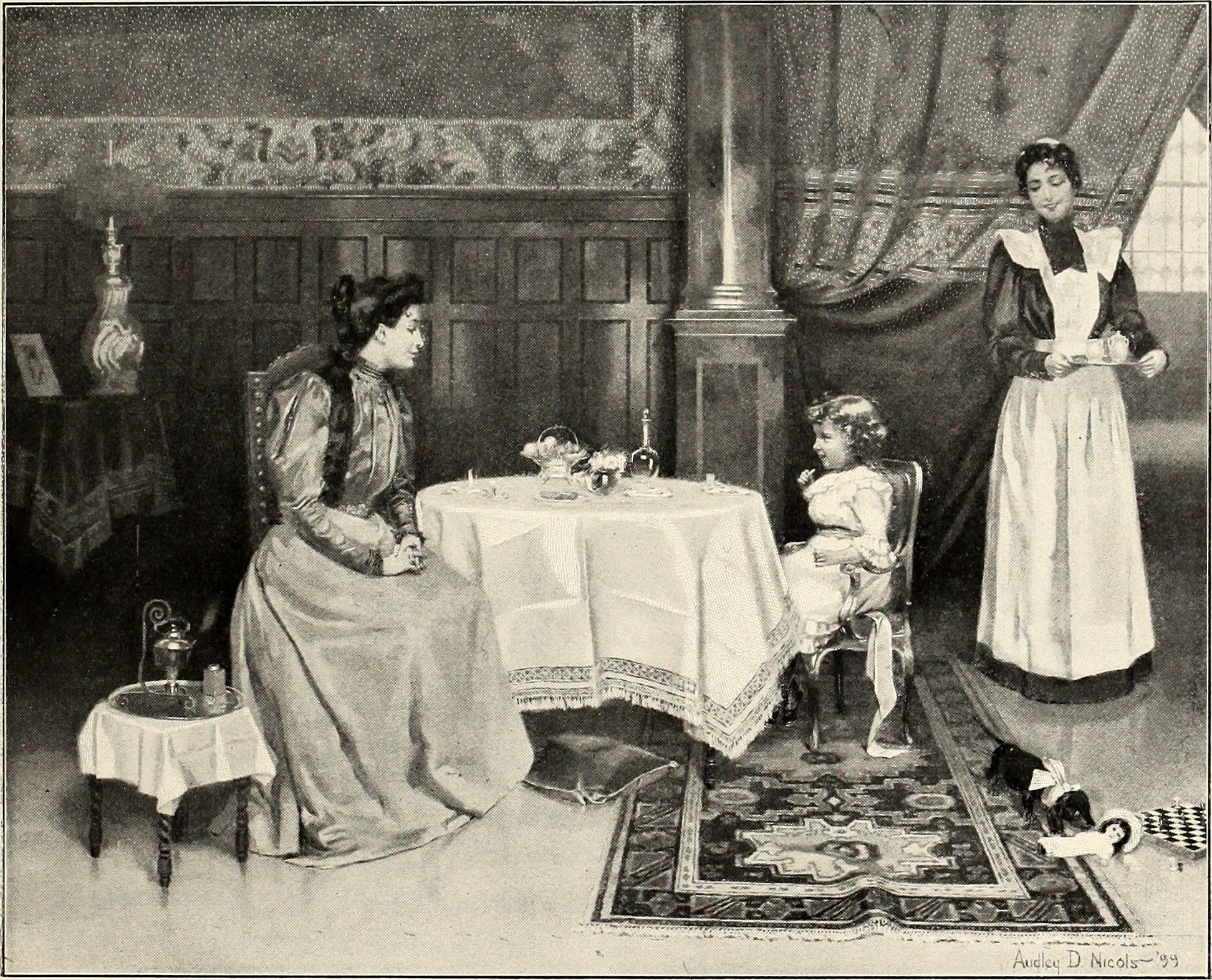
Illustration by Audley Dean Nicols in St. Nicholas Magazine, 1899

Nicols continued to paint desert panoramas of Texas, Arizona, New Mexico, and California, and large canvas on Old West subjects. His 1927 depiction of Tokay, a former coal-mining settlement in Socorro County, New Mexico, is considered a valuable historical record of what is now a ghost town. Also in 1927, a lithograph reproduction of Nicols' painting of Texas' El Capitan peak was distributed in a publicity campaign for the Texas and Pacific Railway. The original painting of the mountain was later placed in Abilene's Research Center for the Southwest, at the Hardin-Simmons University library. In 1929, he was commissioned by architect Henry Trost to design the glass-stained mural which incorporates the 6-by-7-foot (1.8 by 2.1 m) painting Cave creek canyon – Chiricahua mountains, located at the top of the lobby stairs of the Gadsden Hotel in Douglas, Arizona.

In his later life Nicols was characterized as eccentric and mysterious, absorbed by his work, but he had a circle of close friends including other artists and General Robert L. Howze. He was married to Mary Olivia Nicols née Mahoney, an Irish immigrant, and had two children, Audley Dean Jr and Mary Beth. In 1932, he was hospitalized for several weeks due to a brain hemorrhage but eventually recovered. He died almost ten years later in November 1941, just a few months after celebrating his daughter's 10th birthday. The artist was buried in Restlawn Memorial Park in El Paso, with writer and muralist Tom Lea, who was also Mary Beth's godfather, acting as one of the pallbearers.

== Style and legacy ==
Audley Dean Nicols' style of clean, detailed landscape painting was inspired by the clarity, sharp lines and strong contrasts of the desert, and he applied techniques to capture the colors and hint at the vast expanses. Nicols said in 1916:

The desert is everything but gray. There are clean fresh blues, pinks and yellows in the skies, opalescent purple, rose and lavender in the ever-present distant mountains, dull greens of every shade in the vegetation, reds and yellows in the rocks and earth -but never gray.

Critics have recognized his depiction of the distinctive nature of desert light as one of the best. Nicols' compositions are often organized in three horizontal sections; the desert ground and vegetation below, mountains in the middle and the sky above. He depicted vibrant nature scenes with only small traces of humans, if any, using warm light and vivid colors such as bluish purple for the distant mountains. The style and subjects of his work achieved significant popularity and were followed by other West Texas artists, who collectively became known as the "Purple Mountain Painters". Nicols was a friend of other local El Paso artists such as Fremont Ellis and Lewis Teel, and encouraged Eugene Thurston to start painting.

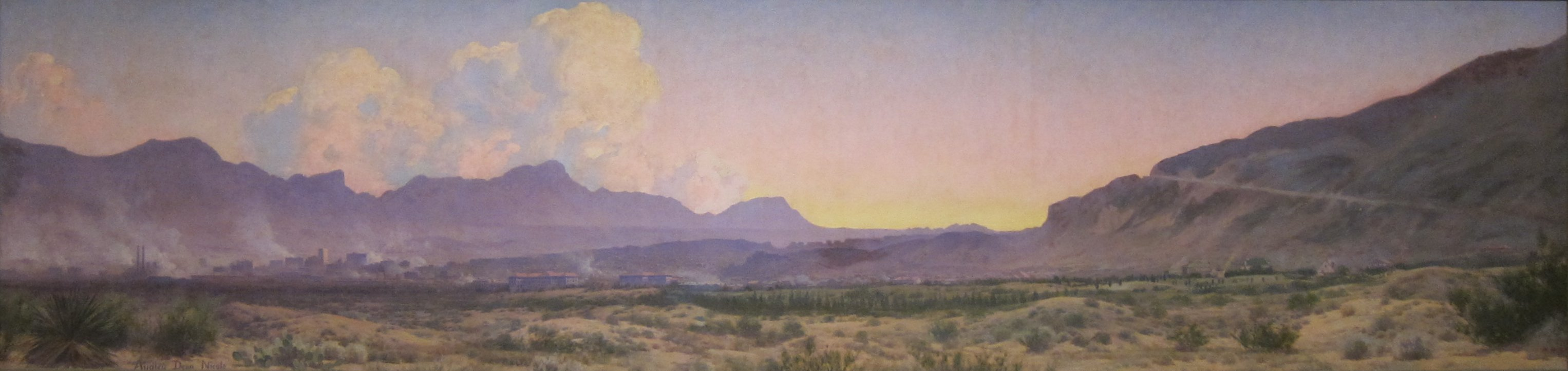
View of El Paso at sunset (c. 1922–1925), El Paso Museum of Art

Nicols is considered an important early Texas artist who is especially known for his large-scale portrayals of desert scenes, although he mostly depicted human subjects in his earlier work, and got an honorable mention in the 1927 San Antonio wild flower competition organized by oilman and philanthropist Edgar B. Davis. Nicols' work View of El Paso at sunset was included in the 2019 major exhibition "The Art of Texas: 250 Years" at the Witte Museum, San Antonio. This 22-foot (6.7 m) painting was commissioned by the First National Bank of El Paso in 1925; when the bank closed in 1933, a local resident purchased it and donated it to El Paso High School. The painting remained on display at the school library until 1972, when it was taken down for restoration. During renovations of the school in 2000, the painting was discovered in a janitor's closet.

Nicols achieved some national recognition during his lifetime, his well-sold paintings helping to romanticize the Southwest and forming part of several private and public collections, including that of the White House during the Warren G. Harding administration (1921–1923). Records show that 14-by-22-inch (36 by 56 cm) paintings by Nicols sold at between $250 and $500 by the end of the 1920s, which were considerable sums at the time. Results from Heritage Auctions for sales done between 2005 and 2019 show prices ranging from $4,000 to $22,500. In a 2017 Bonhams auction, Desert at dusk (1928) with dimensions of 16-by-24-inch (41 by 61 cm) sold for $35,000. As of 2021, works by Nicols are part of the permanent collections of museums such as the Phoenix Art Museum, Tucson Museum of Art, and El Paso Museum of Art.

== Paintings ==
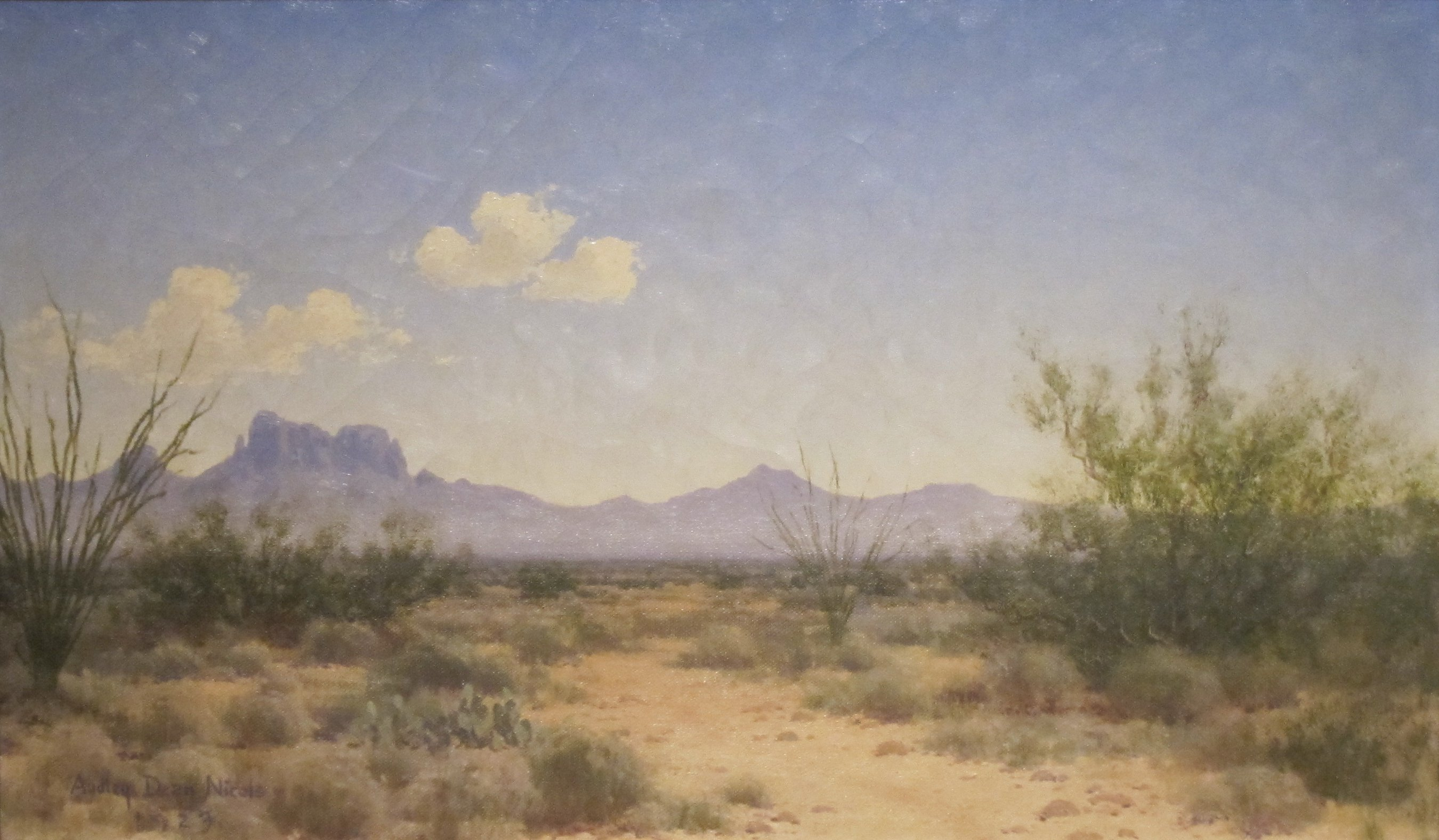
Sunland landscape (1923), El Paso Museum of Art

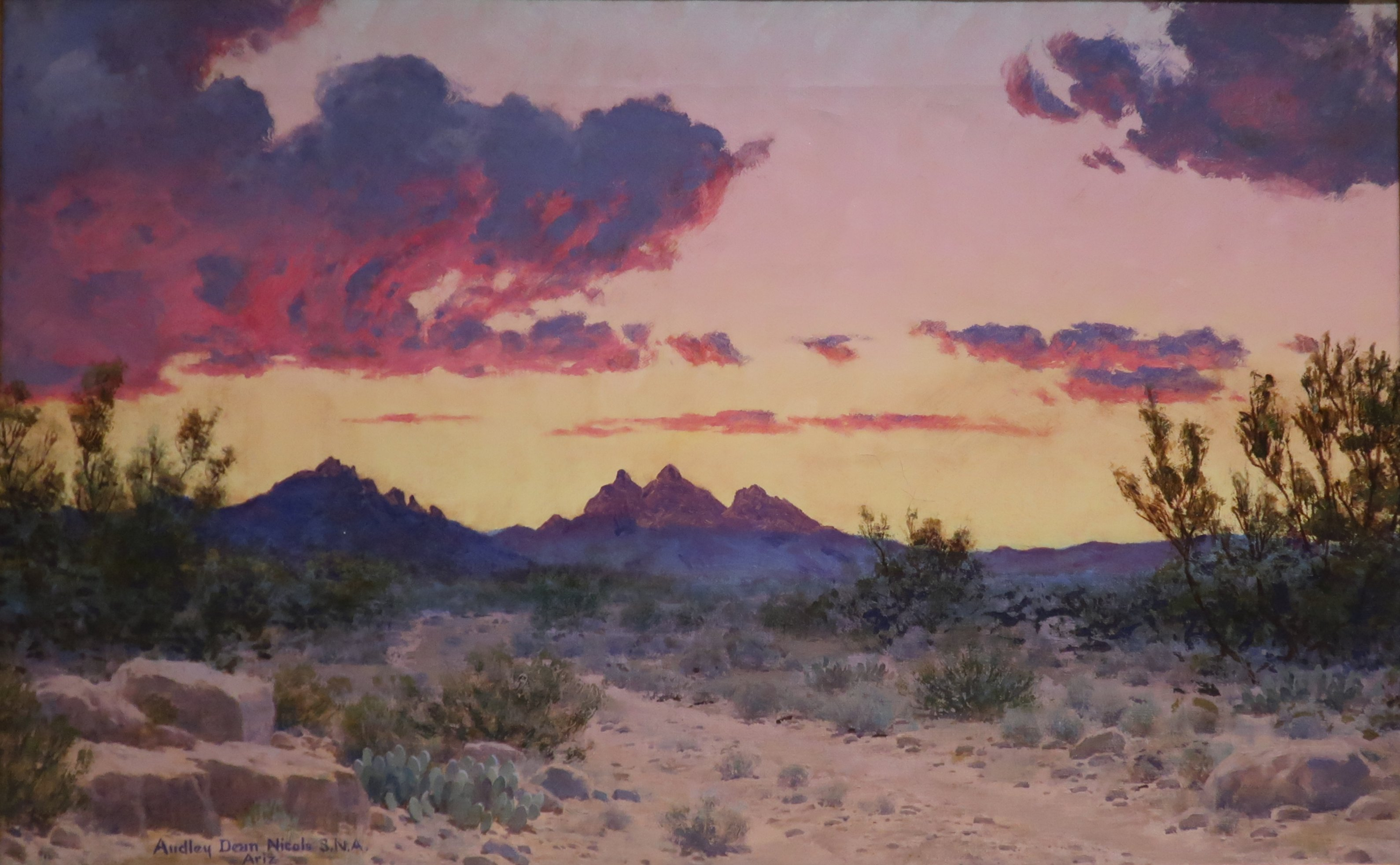
Arizona landscape (1920s), Phoenix Art Museum

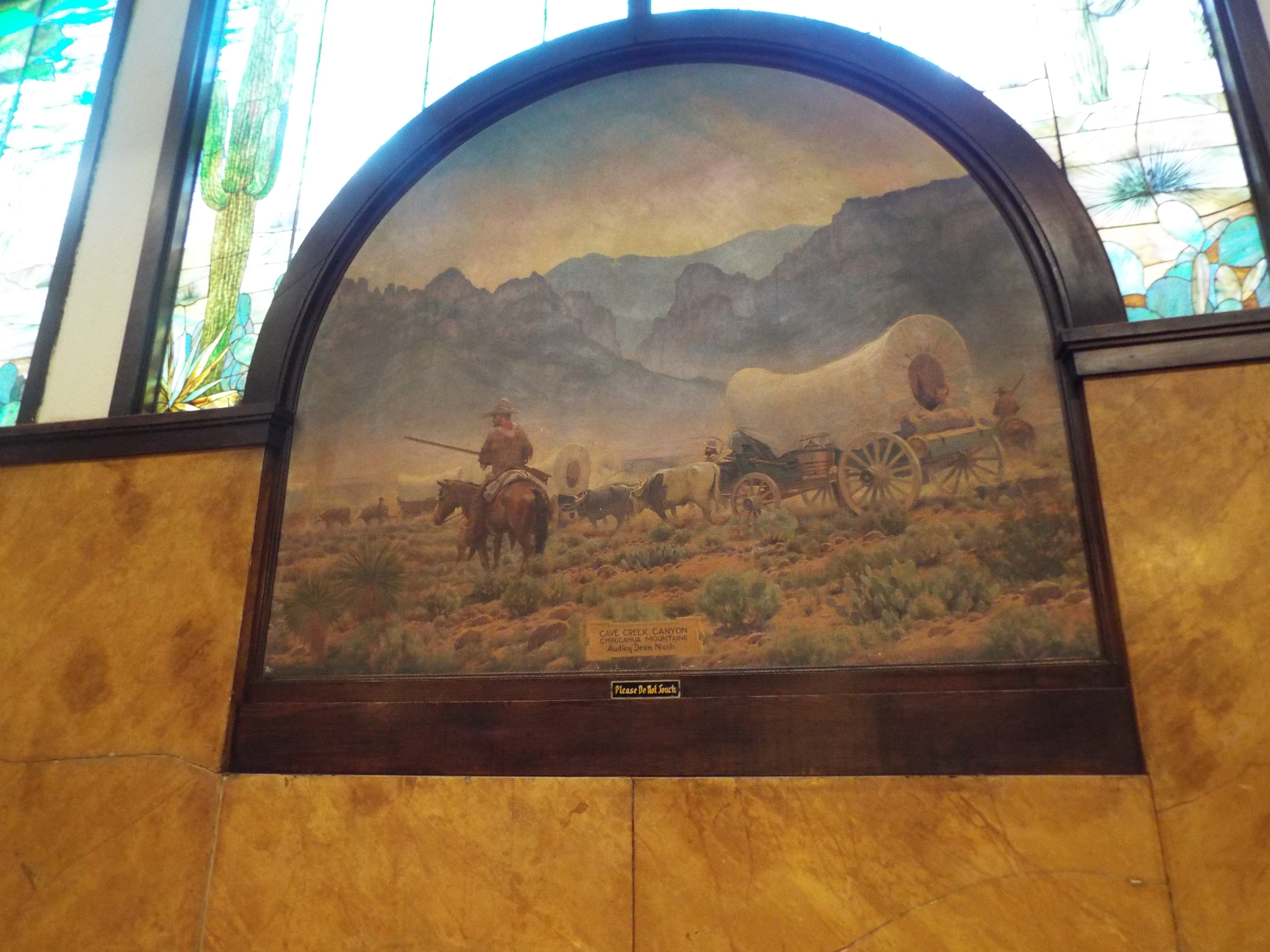
Cave creek canyon (1929), Gadsden Hotel, Douglas, Arizona
