= Effie Anderson Smith =

American painter (1869–1955)

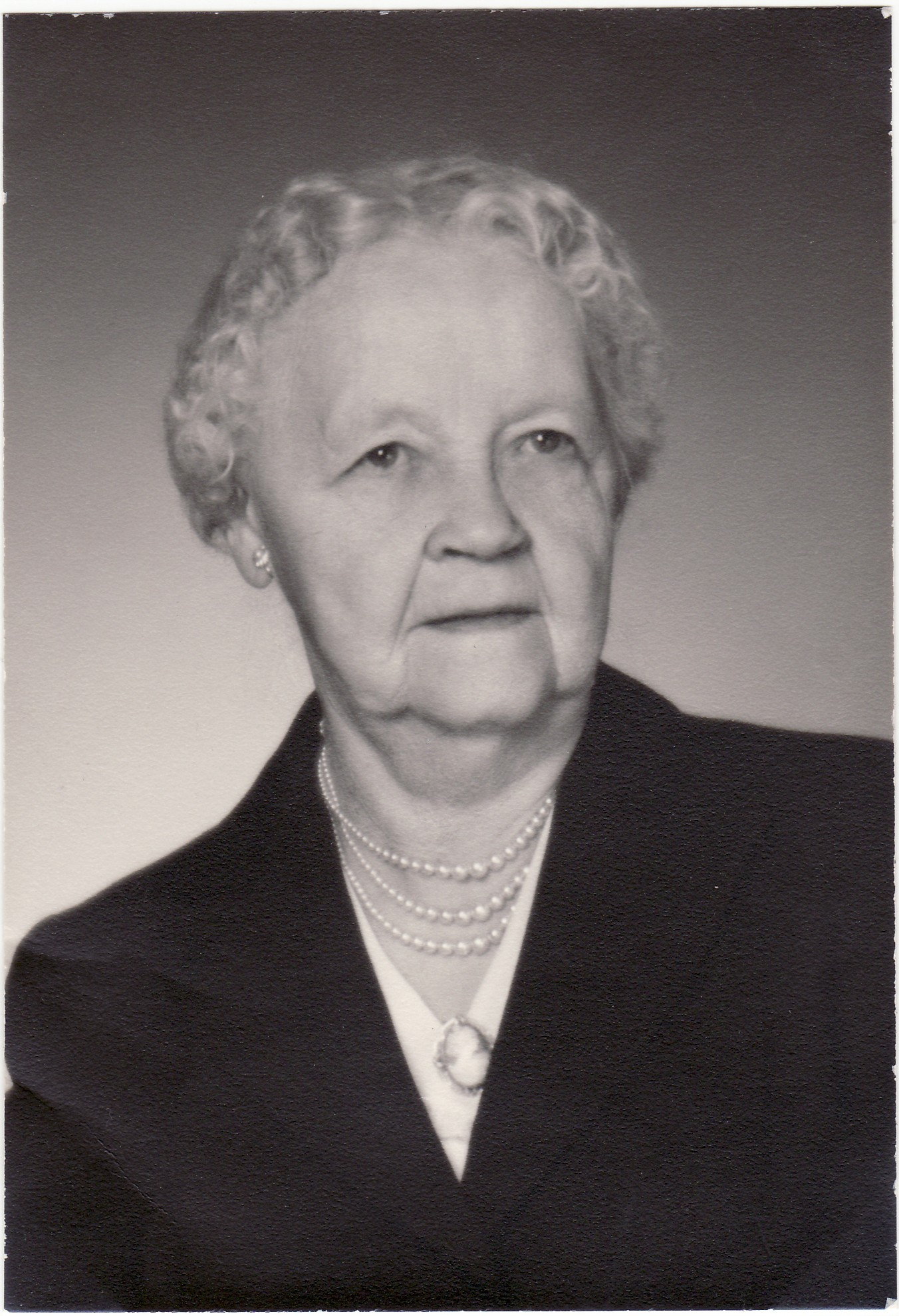
- E.A. Smith ca. 1950
- Born: Effie Anderson; September 29, 1869; Arkansas, US
- Died: April 21, 1955 (aged 85); Prescott, Arizona, US
- Resting place: Mountain View Cemetery, Prescott
- Known for: Painting
- Movement: Impressionism, Regionalism
- Spouse: Weds W.M. Spencer in 1890, Weds A.Y. Smith in 1895

Effie Anderson Smith (September 29, 1869 – April 21, 1955), also known as Mrs. A.Y. Smith, was an early Arizona impressionist painter of desert landscapes, many of Cochise County and the Grand Canyon.

== Biography ==
Smith was born in the rural countryside near Nashville, Arkansas, in 1869. She grew up in Arkansas and served as a school teacher in Hope, Arkansas until 1893, when she left Arkansas for New Mexico, and then Arizona. She studied with California Impressionists in Oakland (1904), with May Bradford Shockley in San Francisco (1908), in Laguna Beach with Anna Althea Hills (1914) and also at the Stickney Memorial Art School in Pasadena with Jean Mannheim and Richard E. Miller (1915–16). Her exhibitions include a show of her Southwest paintings in Corcoran Hall at George Washington University in Washington, DC beginning May 20, 1931. She lived for 56 years in southern Arizona, first in Benson (1895–96), then in Pearce (from 1896 to 1941) and later in Douglas (from 1941 to 1951) in Cochise County, and seasonally in Morenci in Greenlee County at the home of her son Lewis A. Smith.

Smith moved to Prescott, Arizona in 1951, and died there at the Arizona Pioneers' Home in 1955. She was buried at the Mountain View Cemetery in Prescott.

From January 11 to April 28, 2019, the Tucson Desert Art Museum presented a 150th birthday anniversary retrospective exhibit of E.A. Smith's landscapes with 46 of her canvases on display from her most prolific years (1926–1949), including four of her renowned Grand Canyon paintings. The largest permanent public display of E.A. Smith's paintings are on exhibit at the Douglas Historical Society, Douglas, Arizona.

== Gallery ==
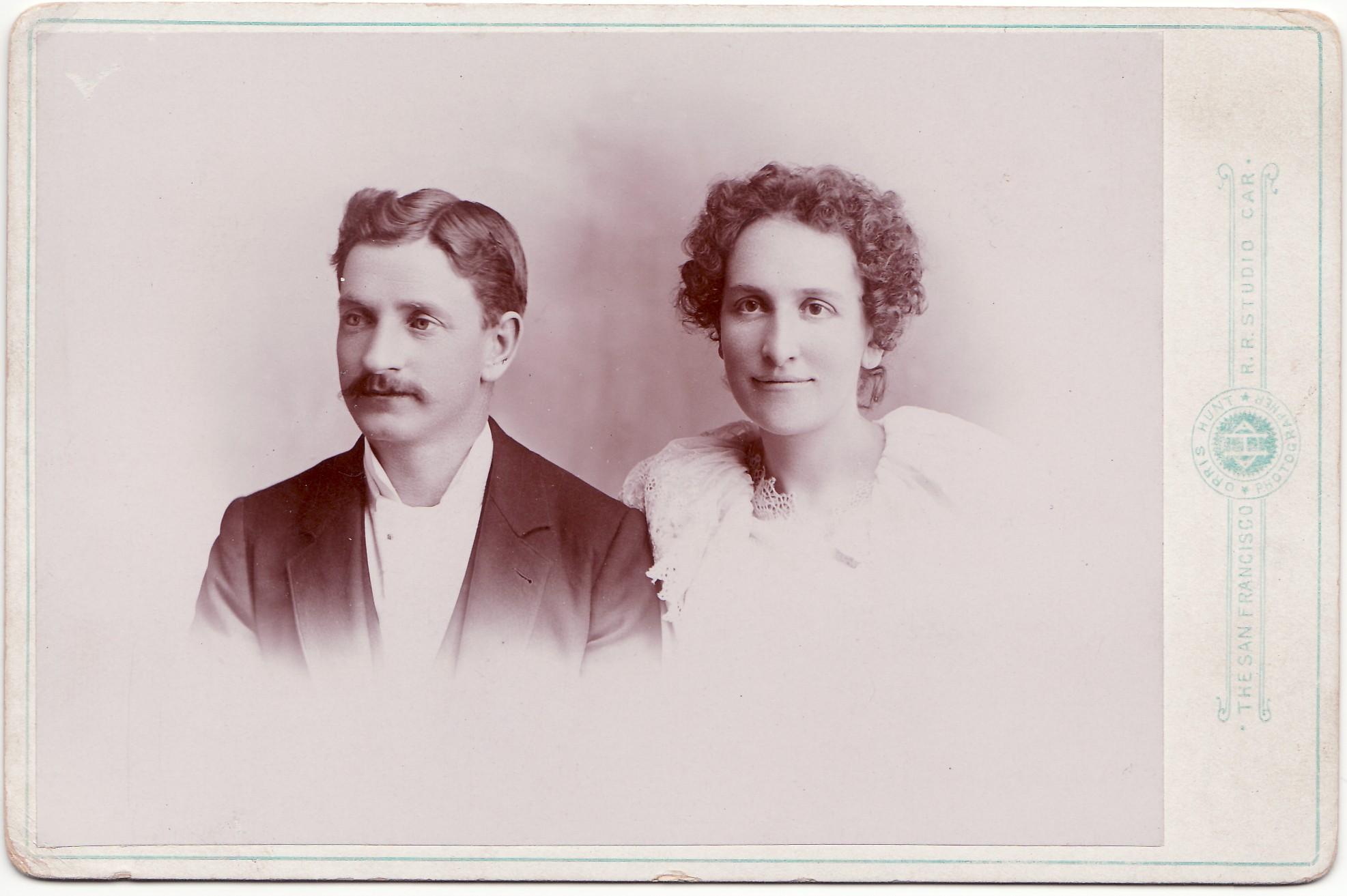
E.A. Smith with husband Andrew Y. Smith, photographed in a San Francisco Railroad Studio Car photograph made around the time of their wedding (1895)

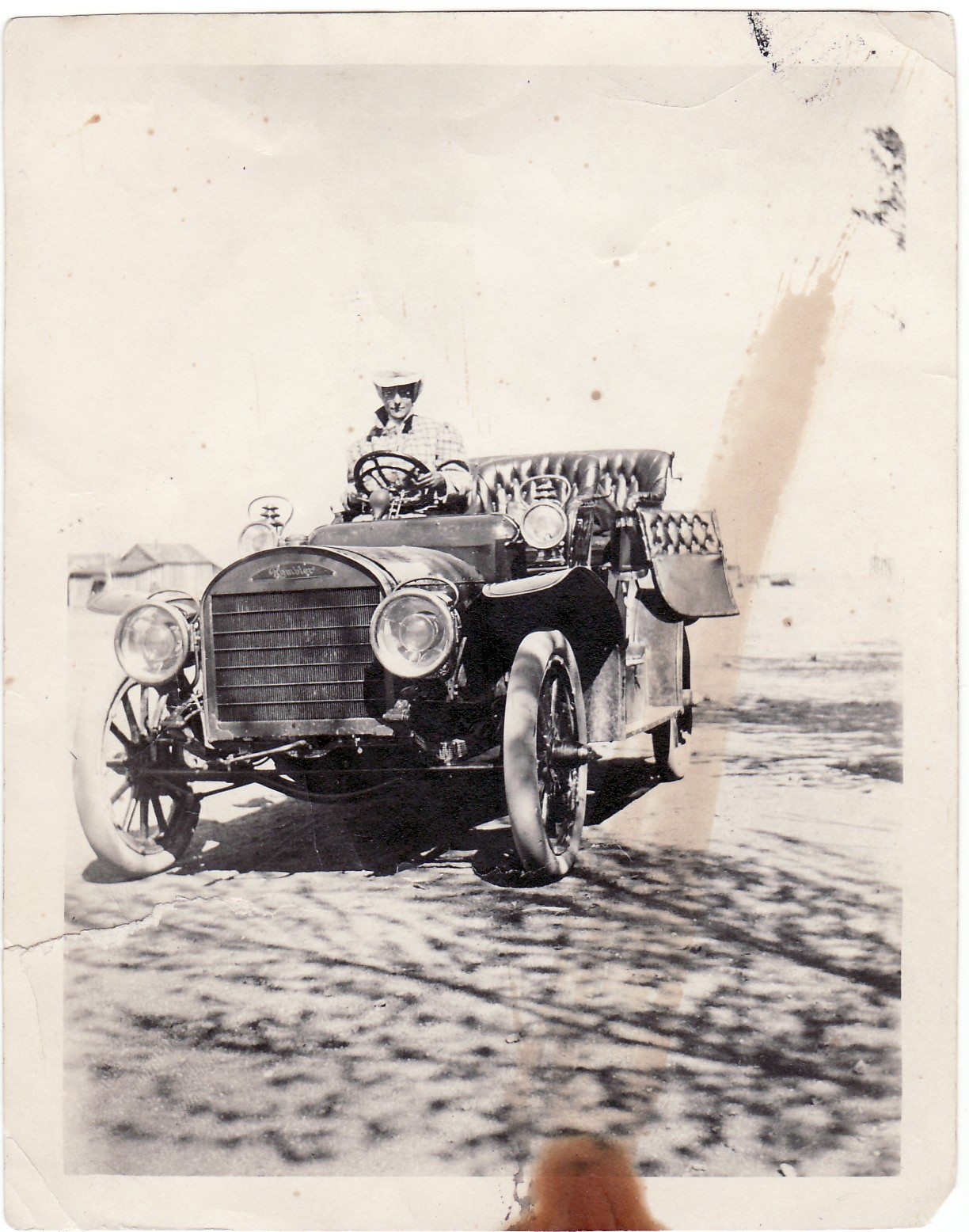
E.A. Smith motoring near her desert home at Pearce, AZ in her Rambler Touring Car, circa 1907

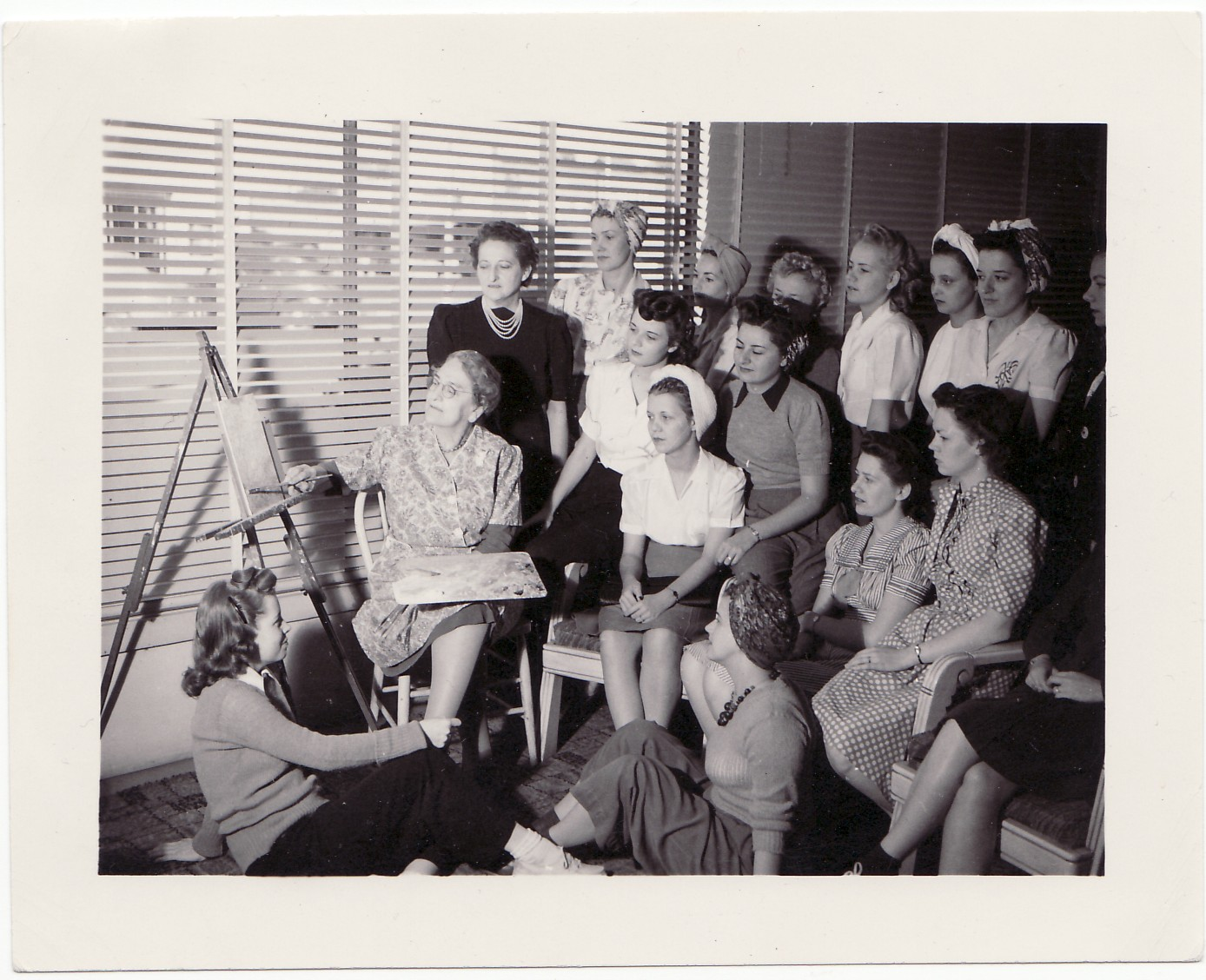
E.A. Smith with students in her Douglas, AZ studio (1940s)
