= The Dylan Ratigan Show =

- Presented by: Dylan Ratigan
- Country of origin: United States
- Original language: English

Production
- Production location: New York City
- Running time: 60 minutes

Original release
- Network: MSNBC
- Release: June 29, 2009 – June 22, 2012

The Dylan Ratigan Show is an American television program on MSNBC hosted by Dylan Ratigan, formerly of sister CNBC's Fast Money. It aired weekdays from 4pm to 5pm Eastern Time. The show was previously known as Morning Meeting with Dylan Ratigan and aired from 9 am to 11 am weekday mornings. It initially launched on June 29, 2009, as part of sweeping changes to MSNBC's daytime weekday programs along with a revamp of the channel's graphics and its launch in high definition.

In December 2009, the show was cut by one hour and later relaunched on January 11, 2010, with a new graphics package and set design. The change was made in order to make room for The Daily Rundown with Chuck Todd and Savannah Guthrie at 9 am, as part of MSNBC's commitment to straight news programming during the day. The show focused on debate and discussion relating to politics and the economy. He also focused on financial/business issues. Ratigan often offered commentary on the subject matter and rebuttal to many of the guests who appear on the show.

On December 6, 2010, The Dylan Ratigan Show announced a partnership with Nucor Steel "to create an innovative road show titled "Steel on Wheels," aiming to bring forth solutions to the most pressing problems facing the American people. The "Steel on Wheels" tour focused on four major themes: The Spirit Of America, Innovation, The Building Of Our Nation, and The Future Of America's New Generations."

Matt Miller was the primary fill-in host for Ratigan on the program.

The final episode aired on June 22, 2012. Martin Bashir moved his program into the 4 p.m. hour on June 25.

Preceded by MSNBC Live	MSNBC weekday lineup 4–5 pm	Succeeded by Hardball with Chris Matthews
