= Disappearance of Nancy Guthrie =

2026 missing person case in Arizona, US

Nancy Guthrie
- Born: Nancy Ellen Long; January 27, 1942; Fort Wright, Kentucky, US
- Disappeared: February 1, 2026 (Note: Guthrie was last seen on the evening of January 31, 2026. She was reported missing on February 1 after failing to show up for a virtual church service as expected. The official timeline indicates that she was taken from her home in the early hours of February 1.); Catalina Foothills, Arizona, US (aged 84)
- Status: Missing for 9 months and 17 days
- Spouse: Charles Guthrie (died 1988)
- Children: 3, including Savannah

On February 1, 2026, Nancy Guthrie (née Long), the 84‑year‑old mother of NBC News journalist and Today co-anchor Savannah Guthrie, was kidnapped from her home in Catalina Foothills, a suburb of Tucson, Arizona, United States. Evidence recovered at the residence indicated that Guthrie had been taken against her will, and Pima County sheriff Chris Nanos stated that he believed she had been abducted.

A multi‑agency investigation led by the Pima County Sheriff's Department (PCSD), with assistance from the Federal Bureau of Investigation (FBI), US Customs and Border Protection (CBP) and search-and-rescue teams, has included extensive forensic analysis, neighborhood canvassing and review of surveillance footage. Bloodstains found at the scene were confirmed to be Guthrie's. Multiple ransom notes of undetermined origin demanded payment in cryptocurrency, with two deadlines that had passed by February 9. On February 10, the FBI released still images along with a short video from a video‑doorbell camera, showing an "armed individual" wearing a mask and carrying a backpack tampering with said doorbell camera on Guthrie's property prior to her disappearance.

Family appeals on social media have not yet yielded any "proof of life" sought from the person or persons who abducted Guthrie. On February 24, the family offered $1 million for information that assists in her recovery. Her condition and whereabouts remain unknown. The case has drawn international attention, with Savannah suspending her broadcasting duties, including coverage of the 2026 Winter Olympic Games, to participate in the ongoing search.

A note reportedly sent on February 6, 2026, claimed that Guthrie died shortly after her kidnapping. Law enforcement requested that the note be kept private to avoid interfering with the investigation; it was not revealed until June 22.

== Background ==
Nancy Ellen Long was born on January 27, 1942, in Fort Wright, Kentucky. She lived in Tucson, Arizona, for more than five decades, having moved there with her family in the early 1970s. She was married to Charles Guthrie until his death at age 49 during a mining exploration trip in Mexico in 1988. She had three children: Camron, Annie and Savannah. According to family members, Guthrie was mentally sharp and independent, and lived alone in her home in the Tucson suburb of Catalina Foothills. At age 84, she had limited mobility and required daily medication for a chronic condition. Before her disappearance, she was active in her community and a regular churchgoer.

== Disappearance ==
Guthrie was last seen at her home in Catalina Foothills on the evening of Saturday, January 31, 2026. She was dropped off by her son‑in‑law, Tommaso Cioni, at approximately 9:50 p.m. Cioni, who is married to Guthrie's daughter Annie, is the last known person to have seen her.

The following morning, Guthrie did not arrive for a scheduled livestream of a church service, prompting concern. A member of her church contacted the family to report that she had not appeared as expected. Relatives went to Guthrie's home around 11 a.m., searched the house and surrounding property, and found no sign of her. Around noon, the family called 9-1-1 and reported Guthrie missing to the Pima County Sheriff's Department (PCSD). Responding deputies noted that Guthrie's personal belongings, including her phone and other essential items, were still inside her home. Given her limited mobility and the absence of any indication that she had left voluntarily, investigators immediately regarded the situation as more than a routine missing‑person report.

Official timeline from Thursday, February 5, 2026, press conference (Note: All times given are Mountain Time (UTC–7).)
Date	Time	Event
Saturday, January 31, 2026	5:32 p.m.	Guthrie takes an Uber taxi to her daughter Annie's home for dinner.
Saturday, January 31, 2026	9:48 p.m.	Guthrie is dropped off by her son-in-law: Annie's husband, Tommaso Cioni.
Saturday, January 31, 2026	9:50 p.m.	Guthrie's garage door is closed. Cioni reportedly drives off at this time.
Sunday, February 1, 2026	1:47 a.m.	A doorbell camera at Guthrie's home is disconnected by a masked and gloved individual.
Sunday, February 1, 2026	2:12 a.m.	Motion was detected. On February 10, the FBI released footage recovered from Google Nest backend systems showing an armed individual tampering with the device.
Sunday, February 1, 2026	2:28 a.m.	Guthrie's bedside pacemaker monitor misses its scheduled transmission.
Sunday, February 1, 2026	~11:00 a.m.	A churchgoer calls Guthrie's family to report that Guthrie did not attend church.
Sunday, February 1, 2026	11:56 a.m.	Relatives arrive at Guthrie's home and discover that she is missing.
Sunday, February 1, 2026	12:03 p.m.	Guthrie's family calls 9-1-1 to report that she is missing.
Sunday, February 1, 2026	12:15 p.m.	Deputies from the Pima County Sheriff's Department arrive.

== Investigations ==
Updated missing person poster, including images of the recovered doorbell camera footage of an intruder. Published by the Federal Bureau of Investigation on February 10, 2026.

=== Initial probes ===
Local, state and federal authorities launched an extensive search following Guthrie's disappearance. PCSD deployed search‑and‑rescue teams, including police dogs, drones and aerial resources, with assistance from U.S. Customs and Border Protection (CBP). Despite these efforts, no trace of Guthrie was found, and on February 2, authorities announced that the case had shifted from a search operation to a criminal investigation.

Pima County sheriff Chris Nanos stated that evidence recovered from Guthrie's residence indicated that a crime had taken place within the house, leading investigators to treat the home as a crime scene and to involve homicide investigators. He expressed disbelief that Guthrie had left the residence voluntarily, stating: "At this point, investigators believe she was taken from her home against her will, possibly in the middle of the night. Taken against her will includes possible kidnapping or abduction. She couldn't walk 50 yards by herself." Nanos told CBS News that he believed she has been abducted.

Because of the suspicious nature of the case, the Federal Bureau of Investigation (FBI) joined the investigation to provide additional resources. Authorities described Guthrie as a vulnerable adult due to her age, mobility limitations and reliance on daily medication, while noting that she had no known cognitive impairments.

Investigators reviewed surveillance footage, digital evidence and neighborhood camera systems, and canvassed nearby residences and surrounding areas. Investigators confirmed that bloodstains were found at or near the entrance of Guthrie's home, and forensic testing later determined that DNA from the blood belonged to Guthrie. Video footage captured by media outlets at the scene appeared to show a trail of blood near the front door. Officials declined to comment on the extent of any injuries or the amount of blood. Law enforcement also reported that personal items had been left behind and that a doorbell security camera had been removed, factors that contributed to the assessment that Guthrie was taken from her home against her will. Officials stated that the residence had been processed and that forensic analysis remained ongoing.

Law enforcement later stated that search activity was paused at times to allow personnel to rest while the investigation continued. Officials reported that, based on the information available, there was no indication of a threat to the general public. Savannah Guthrie stepped away from her broadcasting duties at NBC News, which were to include co-hosting the opening ceremonies of the 2026 Winter Olympic Games, to assist in the search for her mother. In a statement, she thanked law enforcement and members of the public for their support and urged anyone with information about her mother's whereabouts to contact authorities.

During the evening of February 10, a person of interest was detained for questioning following a traffic stop in Rio Rico, Arizona, about sixty miles south of Tucson. Shortly afterward, PCSD and FBI executed a search warrant on a property and vehicle in the same area. By February 11, the searches had concluded and the individual was released without charges. According to Nanos, it was determined that the individual was not involved in the disappearance.

PCSD began an operation on February 13 at a residence two miles from Guthrie's house. Two people were removed from the residence, and roads in the surrounding area were closed to the public for about four hours. One of the people removed from the residence was taken in for questioning and released by the following day. Around the same time, law enforcement investigated a gray Range Rover in the parking lot of a nearby Culver's restaurant. The vehicle was seized and towed away. Gloves which appeared to match those worn by the suspect were found by the FBI, but the DNA on them was eventually traced to a local restaurant worker whom PCSD said was "not considered part of this investigation". The department did note that "other DNA evidence" was being analyzed.

=== Subsequent developments ===
In June 2026, People magazine reported that a tip received by Mexican volunteer search group Buscando Corazones claimed that Guthrie was deceased and buried in a stream near the Mexican municipality of Nogales, along the US-Mexico border, which sparked several unsuccessful searches of the area. Later that month, on June 22, NBC News reported that one of the notes received by media outlets in February contained a claim that Guthrie had died. No ransom demand was included in this note.

The investigation continued through subsequent months. Savannah eventually returned to co-hosting Today. However, NBC News producers reportedly implemented strict procedures on dealing with any news on the investigation that might break during the program. This included sequestering Savannah from the set and discussing the developments privately while another anchor handled the breaking story on air.

In an interview in July 2026, Nanos expressed confidence that physical evidence gathered to date would lead to solving the case. He stated on Today that "we have so much DNA to sort through. We have so much in terms of video evidence to look at," and as a result of this "I'm still positive that we're going to resolve this case." In a separate interview that month he said that testing of hair found at the Guthrie home was complete and did not point to a suspect.

In August 2026, human remains found in the desert north of the Guthrie's home sparked speculation that they might belong to her. However, authorities did not believe that they were connected to the disappearance.

== Doorbell camera footage ==
Doorbell camera footage released by the FBI

On February 10, FBI Director Kash Patel released four black-and-white images on X showing a masked and armed intruder, wearing gloves and a backpack, outside Guthrie's home. PCSD shared the same information. Investigators reported that the intruder attempted to tamper with the video doorbell by attempting to knock it off with light taps and, when unable to, covered the lens with foliage from a potted plant. Despite the individual's attempts, Patel stated that data from the device had been successfully recovered. He also stated that the intruder was armed with what appeared to be a gun, which was placed improperly in a holster located over his crotch. Later that same day, the FBI released two videos captured by the doorbell camera.

On February 12, based on the footage, authorities released additional details about the suspected kidnapper's appearance, including an estimated height of 5 feet 9 inches – 5 feet 10 inches (175–178 cm), an average build, a black mustache, and the 25-liter Ozark Trail Hiker Pack backpack he was carrying.

On February 18, Google announced that it was trying to extract additional footage from the various home cameras.

== Ransom notes ==
=== Early ransom note reports ===
Multiple media outlets reported receiving ransom notes in connection with Guthrie's disappearance, and efforts were underway to determine if they were sent by individuals holding Guthrie. Authorities neither confirmed nor denied the validity of the notes. On February 2, KOLD-TV, a CBS affiliate in Tucson, reported that it had received a letter demanding payment for Guthrie's release. CBS News reported that investigators reviewed the letter, took it seriously and shared it with the FBI, though authorities declined to confirm whether it was sent by someone holding Guthrie. The note was said to contain specific details about Guthrie's home and what she was wearing on the night she disappeared, and investigators requested that its contents not be publicly disclosed. The following day, the website TMZ reported that it had received an alleged ransom note demanding millions of dollars in Bitcoin, including a specific cryptocurrency address and a deadline.

On February 5, Harvey Levin, the founder of TMZ, claimed to have received a ransom note relating to Guthrie's disappearance, allegedly stating "you will have no way of contacting me". That evening, Levin again claimed that he had a ransom letter indicating that Guthrie is still alive but "scared" and is "aware of the demands being made" and that "this will be their only communication"; Levin also emphasized that he and his staff were unsure of the validity of the letter. It is unclear whether these notes were written by a person involved in the disappearance of Guthrie, or if they are hoaxes. Levin claimed that TMZ offered to pay the $100,000 demanded by the kidnappers, but the FBI declined.

PCSD acknowledged that it was aware of reports concerning ransom notes and stated that all tips and materials were being forwarded to detectives working with the FBI. Also on February 5, a California man was arrested on federal charges alleging that he had posed as an abductor and demanded ransom from the Guthrie family. Authorities stated that the scheme was unrelated to the other ransom demands that had received wide publicity. In a video released on February 7, Savannah stated that "we will pay." The following day, it was reported that the ransom demand was $6 million, with a deadline of 5 p.m. on February 9.

On July 2, 42-year-old Derrick Callella of Hawthorne, California, pleaded guilty in federal court to two felony counts of harassment using telecommunications for contacting members of the Guthrie family with a fake ransom demand. He was charged with making three ransom demands–two by text, one in a phone call. On August 31 he was sentenced to two five-year probation terms that will be served concurrently.

=== Subsequent messages ===
In the months following the disappearance, media outlets continued to receive messages claiming to have new information. Former FBI agents have commented that sharing ransom notes through the media, rather than directly with the family, was "highly unusual."

On June 22, news outlets reported that another note received in February claimed that Guthrie had died. According to the note, she had died shortly after the kidnapping; the kidnappers expressed regret at her death and made no further demands. Law enforcement believed that this note was a "legitimate communication" from the kidnappers.

On June 30, Reuters reported the FBI had determined that the two ransom notes reported in early February, and the third TMZ reported on June 26 they had received, were fakes.

Details of the first two ransom notes were revealed by former KTVK reporter Brianna Whitney in a podcast on July 22. Whitney stated that the initial ransom note, containing two details only known to the abductor, gave ransom demands and said

"Hello Savannah. We have your mother, Nancy. She is safe, but scared. She will be held for ransom and once payment is received will be released unharmed. We will be holding her for a maximum of seven days."

The note was described as saying that once payment was received, Guthrie would be released within twelve hours "at a safe drop-off location back in Tucson." If the second deadline passed, the note said, she would be murdered. It was described as saying

"There will be no negotiation. Do not play games. Law enforcement will not be able to help you."

According to Whitney, the second note, received February 6, stated that Guthrie had died and said,

"We did not fully grasp the seriousness of her physical conditions. We never intended to hurt her. That was not our intention. She perished shortly after she was taken. We believe it was heart-related. She is buried in nature now."

As described by Whitney, the note ended with an apology.

== Guthrie family videos ==
Savannah Guthrie publicly addressed her mother's disappearance in a video statement shared on social media on February 4, 2026. She appeared alongside her siblings, Annie and Camron. In the statement, Savannah said the family was aware of reports concerning a ransom letter and directed her remarks to the individual responsible for their mother's disappearance, saying that the family was "ready to talk". She added that, given the ease with which voices and images can be manipulated, the family needed confirmation that Guthrie was alive and being held, stating, "We want to hear from you, and we are ready to listen. Please reach out to us."

On February 7, Savannah and her siblings released a video that appeared to address a person or group potentially connected to their mother's disappearance. In the message, Savannah said, "We received your message, and we understand. We beg you now to return our mother to us so that we can celebrate with her; this is the only way we will have peace. This is very valuable to us, and we will pay." On June 22, a report by NBC News suggested that this video was in response to a note claiming that Guthrie had died.

On February 24, Savannah released a video announcing her family's offer of a $1 million reward for information that assists in Guthrie's recovery, with the family's understanding she has possibly already died, although they remain hopeful. Around the same time, they donated $500,000 to the National Center for Missing & Exploited Children as a way to support other families going through a similar situation.

On July 27, Savannah issued a plea for return of her mother. She said in an Instagram video that "our family is in agony" and said "I'm asking you, begging you to do the right thing now. Make the right choice. Help us find her. Tell us where to look for her. I truly believe it is never too late to do the right thing."

On November 1, 2026, Savannah Guthrie shared an emotional plea on Instagram, writing that nine months after her mother's disappearance the family still aches for answers and "cannot move forward" without knowing what happened. Alongside a heartfelt drawing memory from her daughter and a throwback photo of her mother, Savannah urged anyone with information to come forward, reminding the public that a substantial reward remains available to help bring her family closure and give her mother the dignity she deserves.

== Responses ==
The White House posted information about Guthrie on its social media accounts, urging the public to report any relevant information. Following an interview with NBC Nightly News anchor Tom Llamas, President Donald Trump called Savannah on February 4, 2026, offering additional federal resources and expressing hope for her mother's safe recovery. During the call, Savannah thanked the president and law enforcement, saying that her family was devastated and praying. On February 16, Trump also threatened capital punishment on the kidnappers.

For her first interview since her mother's disappearance, Savannah sat with her former co-host Hoda Kotb and revealed her story for Today, which aired in three parts on March 26 and 27.

== See also ==
- List of people who disappeared mysteriously (2000–present)
