= MCCJ =

MCCJ may refer to:

- Comboni Missionaries of the Heart of Jesus, Missionarii Comboniani Cordis Jesu, a Christian missionary order founded in the 19th century by Daniel Comboni
- Miami Coalition of Christians and Jews, a nonprofit organization founded in Florida in 1935
