= Chuck Todd =

American journalist (born 1972)

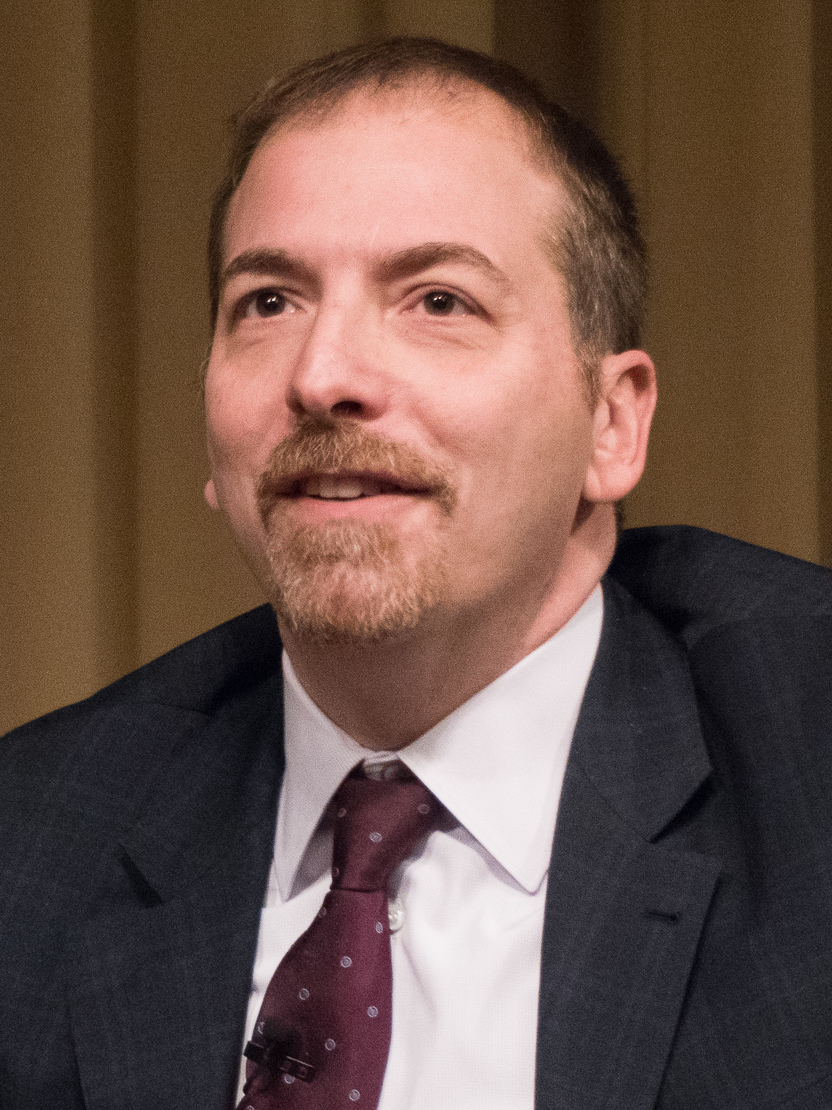
- Todd in 2018
- Born: Charles David Todd; April 8, 1972 (age 54); Miami, Florida, U.S.
- Education: George Washington University
- Occupation: Journalist
- Title: NBC News Chief Political Analyst; Adjunct Professor, Johns Hopkins University
- Spouse: Kristian Denny (m. 2001)
- Children: 2
- Website: Meet the Press Official Website

Charles David Todd (born April 8, 1972) is an American journalist who was the 12th moderator of NBC's Meet the Press and is the current host of the podcast "The Chuck ToddCast." During his time at NBC News between 2007 and 2025, Todd also hosted Meet the Press Now, its daily edition on NBC News Now, and served as the Chief Political Analyst for NBC News as well. Before taking the helm of Meet the Press, Todd was Chief White House correspondent for NBC as well as host of The Daily Rundown on MSNBC. He also served as NBC News' on-air political analyst for NBC Nightly News with Lester Holt and Today.

In June 2023, Todd announced that Kristen Welker would replace him as the moderator of Meet the Press in September 2023. She became the host on September 17, 2023. In January 2025, he announced his exit from NBCUniversal to pursue other endeavors.

== Early life and education ==
Todd was born on April 8, 1972 in Miami, Florida, the son of Lois Cheri (née Bernstein) and Stephen Randolph Todd. He is Jewish on his mother's side and was raised Jewish. He graduated from Miami Killian Senior High School in Kendall, an unincorporated suburban community in greater Miami. Todd attended George Washington University from 1990 to 1994. He declared a major in political science and a minor in music but did not earn a degree.

== Career ==
=== Political campaigns ===
Before entering the world of political reporting and analysis, Todd earned practical political experience on initiative campaigns in Florida and various national campaigns based in Washington, D.C. While in college, Todd worked for the 1992 presidential campaign of Senator Tom Harkin (D-Iowa) and later started working part-time at National Journal's The Hotline.

=== The Hotline ===
From 1992 until March 12, 2007, Todd worked for National Journal's The Hotline, where he was editor-in-chief for six years. As part of his position, Todd also co-hosted, with John Mercurio, the webcast series Hotline TV, consisting of a daily show lasting between three and seven minutes and a weekly show ranging between 20 and 30 minutes. He became a frequent guest on political discussion shows, such as Hardball with Chris Matthews and Inside Politics with Judy Woodruff.

=== NBC News ===
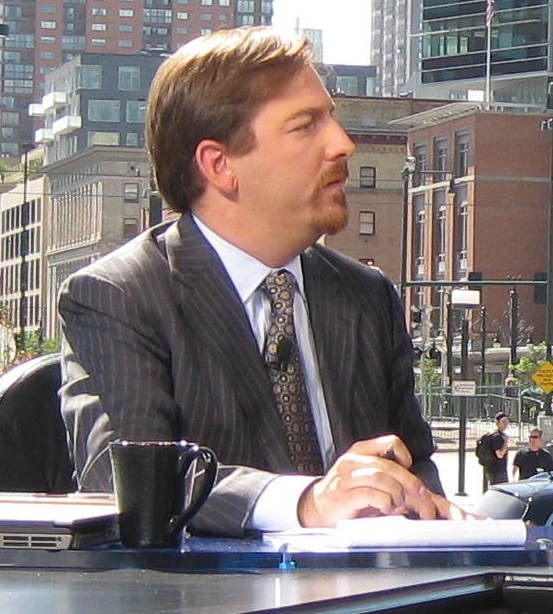
Todd covering the 2008 Democratic National Convention for MSNBC

Tim Russert brought Todd to NBC from The Hotline in March 2007. He became the NBC News political director at that time. In this role, Todd often provided on-air political analysis on political discussion shows, including Morning Joe, Hardball with Chris Matthews, Meet the Press, NBC Nightly News with Lester Holt, and The Rachel Maddow Show and blogged for MSNBC.com at "First Read". He also did a weekly Question and Answer ("Q&A") session with users at Newsvine.

After Tim Russert's death in June 2008, Todd was a candidate to replace him as the host of NBC's Meet the Press, but David Gregory was ultimately selected for the job. On December 18, 2008, NBC announced that Todd would succeed Gregory as NBC News Chief White House Correspondent, partnering with Savannah Guthrie on the news beat. He retained his title as NBC News Political Director and was also named Contributing Editor to Meet the Press. Todd was a focus of an August 2008 Los Angeles Times article paralleling Todd's rise to the rise of cable news networks in coverage of U.S. politics. The article noted the emergence of Todd's fans, deemed "Chuckolytes".

On July 6, 2009, former MSNBC television personality Dan Abrams launched a website service, Mediaite, reporting on media figures. The site ranks all TV-based journalists in America by influence. Todd ranked, as of October 2009, right before Mike Wallace as number five. Todd rose to number two as of December 21, 2011, but fell to 90 as of January 9, 2013. On January 11, 2010, Todd became co-host, with Savannah Guthrie, of The Daily Rundown on MSNBC, airing weekday mornings from 09:00 to 10:00 ET.

On August 14, 2014, NBC announced that Todd would take over as the host of Meet the Press beginning September 7, 2014. While remaining as NBC News political director, Todd left his role as chief White House correspondent as well as anchor of The Daily Rundown.

On July 23, 2015, MSNBC announced Todd would return to the network with a daily political show called MTP Daily, which was airing weekdays at 17:00 ET. The show was an extension of Meet the Press. Todd continued moderating Meet the Press on NBC.

On January 22, 2017, Todd interviewed Kellyanne Conway on Meet the Press, the day after White House Press Secretary Sean Spicer accused the media of deliberately under-reporting the crowd size at President Trump's inaugural ceremony. In a response to Todd's question about the claims, Conway said:

"Our press secretary, Sean Spicer, gave alternative facts to that [i.e., Donald Trump's inaugural crowd size], but the point remains that..."

Todd interrupted her, saying:

"Wait a minute. Alternative facts? ... Alternative facts are not facts. They're falsehoods."

On June 26 and 27, 2019, Todd, along with Jose Diaz-Balart, Savannah Guthrie, Lester Holt, and Rachel Maddow, moderated the first pair of 2020 Democratic Party presidential debates. Todd's performance as a moderator, in which he ended up speaking more than all but three of the ten presidential candidates on the first debate, was widely panned. He was particularly criticized for asking candidates lengthy questions and then requesting them to respond "in one or two words".

In a December 2019 interview with Rolling Stone, Todd discussed his belief about how disinformation overtook the media during the Trump administration. However, although Todd had addressed "alternative facts" being lies in January 2017, PressThink—a project of the Arthur L. Carter Journalism Institute at New York University—took Todd to task for failing to address the issues as they unfolded.

On June 4, 2023, at the end of Meet the Press, Todd announced he would be stepping down from his role as the program moderator later in the year, handing that role to Kristen Welker, as he had hoped—saying that his three decades in the news business had deprived his family, and indicating that he was delighted with the circumstances of his departure, saying it was just the way he had hoped.

On January 12, 2025, Semafor published a report, claiming Todd had been "quietly" meeting with organizers in Washington media, with plans to exit NBC "when his contract is up" sometime later in the year. On January 31, in a memo to staff, he announced his exit from the NBC. He wrote: "There's never a perfect time to leave a place that's been a professional home for so long, but I'm pretty excited about a few new projects that are on the cusp of going from 'pie in the sky' to 'near reality. So I'm grateful for the chance to get a jump start on my next chapter during this important moment."

=== Other professional ventures ===
Todd is an adjunct professor at Johns Hopkins University. He is the author of The Stranger: Barack Obama in the White House. Published in 2014, the Chicago Tribune described the book as "richly sourced and deeply informed," while Publishers Weekly called it "an even-handed, concise, and thorough account." Todd is also co-author, with Sheldon Gawiser, of How Barack Obama Won: A State-by-State Guide to the Historic 2008 Presidential Election, published in 2009. Todd picks NFL football games for Tony Kornheiser on his podcast The Tony Kornheiser Show. Each week, Todd is pitted against Reginald, a monkey, who also picks NFL games. Since September 2016, Todd has hosted the weekly Chuck Toddcast.

== Personal life ==
Todd resides in Arlington, Virginia with his wife, Kristian Denny Todd, and their two children. Kristian Todd is a communications professional and co-founder of Maverick Strategies and Mail, which provides direct-mail and consulting services for Democratic candidates and progressive causes. She was the spokesperson for the successful U.S. Senate campaign of Jim Webb in 2006. Although his wife is Christian, they are raising their two children in the Jewish faith.

Todd is a congregant in the Reform congregation of Temple Rodef Shalom in Falls Church, Virginia.

Todd is an avid Miami Hurricanes football fan.

== Awards and honors ==
- Emmy Awards (shared with several other NBC journalists)
  - 2009 Winner, Outstanding Coverage of a Breaking News Story in a Regularly Scheduled Newscast: NBC Nightly News with Lester Holt for "Bailout Talks Collapse"
  - 2009 Nominee, Outstanding Coverage of a Breaking News Story in a News Magazine: NBC News for coverage of "Hurricane Gustav"
  - 2010 Winner, Outstanding Coverage of a Breaking News Story in a Regularly Scheduled Newscast: NBC Nightly News with Lester Holt, for "The Miracle on the Hudson"
  - 2010 Nominee, Outstanding Live Coverage of a Current News Story - Long Form, for NBC News Special: The Inauguration of Barack Obama
  - 2011 Nominee, Outstanding Live Coverage of a Current News Story - Long Form: NBC News forDecision 2010
  - 2011 Nominee, Outstanding Coverage of a Breaking News Story in a Regularly Scheduled Newscast: NBC Nightly News with Lester Holt for "Iraq: The Long Way Out"
  - 2015 Nominee, Outstanding Interview: Meet the Press for "Former Vice President Dick Cheney Interview"
  - 2018 Nominee, Outstanding Short Documentary: for Edith+Eddie
- Honorary degrees:
  - Honorary Doctor of Humane Letters degree (2013) from Marymount University in recognition of his work in journalism.
  - Honorary Doctor of Public Service degree (2022) from George Washington University
  - honorary degree, Marist College
- 2022 Foreign Press Award, The Association and the Club of Foreign Press Correspondents in the United States, retrieved June 5, 2023
- 2019 Hank Meyer Headliner Award, for journalists who create an inclusive community, Miami Coalition of Christians and Jews.
- Named "The Most Powerful Journalist in Washington" by GQ as part of the magazine's "50 Most Powerful People in Washington" list.

== Published works ==
- Todd, Chuck and Sheldon Gawiser (2009). How Barack Obama Won.
- Todd, Chuck (2014). The Stranger: Barack Obama in the White House. Little, Brown and Company. ISBN 978-0316079570.

Media offices
Preceded by David Gregory	Meet the Press Moderator; September 7, 2014 – September 10, 2023	Succeeded by Kristen Welker
