= Ben Daniels (pioneer) =

American lawman active in Arizona (1852–1923)

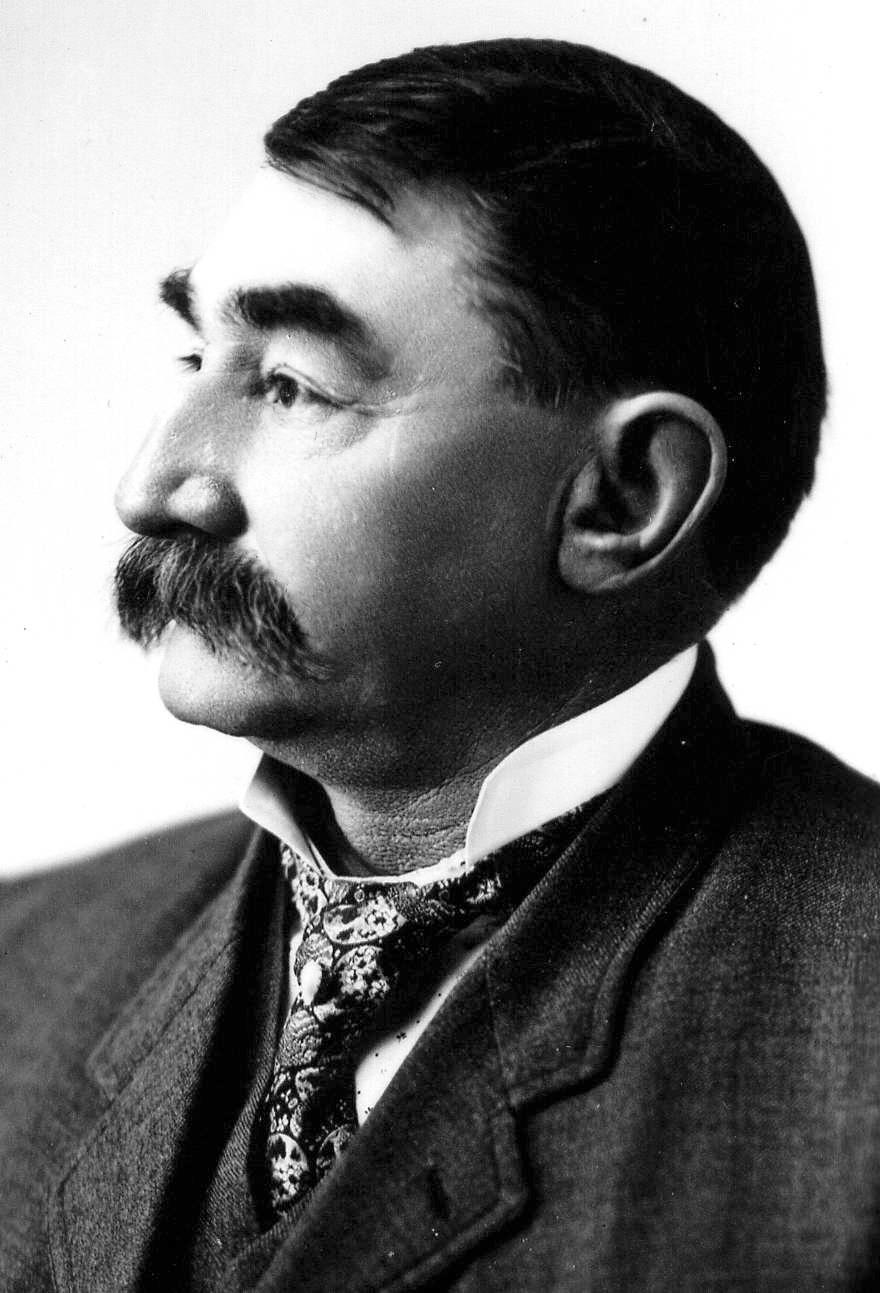
- Born: Benjamin Franklin Daniels; November 4, 1852; Illinois, U.S.
- Died: April 20, 1923 (aged 70); Tucson, Arizona
- Burial place: Evergreen Cemetery, Tucson, Arizona, U.S.
- Spouse(s): Anna Laura Broaddus and Anna Evaline "Eva" (Stakebake) Seayrs
- Military career
- Allegiance: United States of America
- Branch: United States Army
- Service years: 1898
- Rank: Private
- Unit: Rough Riders
- Conflicts: Gray County War: Battle of Cimarron; Spanish–American War: Battle of Las Guasimas; Battle of San Juan Hill; Siege of Santiago
- Other work: Marshal, sheriff

Benjamin Franklin Daniels (November 4, 1852 – April 20, 1923) was an Arizona pioneer, best known for serving as a lawman in rough Western towns and the sheriff of Pima County shortly before his death in 1923. He was also a member of the Rough Riders, superintendent of the Yuma Territorial Prison, United States Marshal for the Territory of Arizona and a miner.

== Biography ==
Benjamin Franklin Daniels had a rough childhood growing up in Illinois. He was born on November 4, 1852, to Aaron Daniels and Mariah Sanders, but lost his mother, two brothers, and four sisters to cholera when he was still very young. Sometime in 1863 or 1864, when he was eleven years old, Daniels moved with his father and stepmother to Kansas. By the age of sixteen he was on his own, cowboying in Texas and working as a buffalo hunter in Kansas. By his late twenties, Daniel was at Camp Carlin, Wyoming, where he was convicted of stealing army mules and sentenced to three years and six months. On November 20, 1879, Daniels entered the Wyoming Territorial Penitentiary as Convict No. 88.

=== Dodge City ===
Daniels was released from prison on August 28, 1883. He headed for Dodge City, where he cultivated the friendship of Bat Masterson and Bill Tilghman. When City Marshal Tilghman's assistant marshal, Tom Nixon, was killed by "Mysterious Dave" Mather, Tilghman recommended Daniels as a suitable replacement. Daniels was duly appointed on July 24, 1884, at a salary of $100 a month. Daniels' term as assistant marshal expired on April 10, 1886. He then opened the Green Front Saloon in Dodge City. Ed Julian, the owner of a restaurant next door to the Green Front, began complaining about the noise and rowdy behavior emanating from Daniels' saloon. On April 15, 1886, Daniels was ordered by town officials to close his saloon. He immediately went looking for Julian, and when he spotted him he shot him in the back. The evidence clearly pointed to the shooting being murder, but Daniels was acquitted. Following the verdict, Daniels moved on.

=== Marriage ===
Ben Daniels married Annie Laura "Annie" Broaddus at Blue Springs, Missouri on March 6, 1887. Both the marriage license and certificate listed the applicants as "Benjamin F. Daniels, 34 years of age, Dodge City, Kansas" and "Anna L. Broaddus, age 28, of Blue Springs, Missouri." The newlyweds moved to Lamar, Bent County, Colorado where Ben accepted an appointment as deputy sheriff of Bent County during January 1888.

=== Gray County War ===
In the late 1880s, Ben became involved in the Gray County War, which was a dispute over the location of the Gray County seat in western Kansas. Ben was one of the lawmen who participated in the gunfight in Cimarron on January 12, 1889. At least one man was killed during the fighting and seven others wounded. Ben and a few of his partners shot their way out of town while the remaining four were besieged and eventually forced to surrender by the people of Cimarron, who had the lawmen surrounded in the Old Gray County Courthouse. During 1893 Ben Daniels and his wife moved to the new boomtown of Cripple Creek, Colorado where he pursued his gambling interests and performed occasional service as a lawman.

=== Rough Riders ===
When the Spanish–American War broke out, 46-year-old Ben Daniels enlisted in Troop K of the First Volunteer U.S. Cavalry—better known as "The Rough Riders." Ben was still living in Cripple Creek, where the local paper reported that "Ben Daniels left last night for San Antonio, Tex. He goes as Cripple Creek's contribution to 'Teddy's Terrors', " the cowboy regiment raised by [Leonard] Wood and Roosevelt ..." Ben Daniels was remembered well by Lt. Col. Theodore Roosevelt, who recalled in his 1899 book The Rough Riders:

Some of our best recruits came from Colorado. One, a very large, hawk-eyed man, Benjamin Franklin Daniels, had been Marshal [sic] of Dodge City when that pleasing town was probably the toughest abode of civilized man to be found anywhere on the continent. In the course of his rather lurid functions as peace officer he had lost half of one ear—'bitten off,' as it was explained to me. Naturally he viewed the dangers of battle with philosophic calm. Such a man was, in reality, a veteran even in his first fight, and was a tower of strength to the recruits in his part of the line.

Ben Daniels survived San Juan Hill, and the more-deadly malaria-carrying mosquitoes to return to the states as a hero of what had been termed a "Splendid Little War." Ben was present at Camp Wikoff, Long Island, New York on September 15, 1898 when Theodore Roosevelt and his "Rough Riders" were officially mustered out.

=== United States Marshal for the Territory of Arizona (first appointment) ===
After being mustered out of the Rough Riders, Daniels began what would become a 20-year correspondence with Theodore Roosevelt. After Roosevelt's ascension to the presidency in September 1901, Daniels began asking if the president could provide him with some sort of employment. On January 8, 1902, President Roosevelt appointed Ben Daniels as United States Marshal for the Territory of Arizona. That appointment was subject to confirmation by a majority of the United States Senate. Daniels appointment was confirmed by the senate on January 30, 1902.

Within a week, Daniels' appointment was called into question. Somehow, one of the people who had been opposed to Daniels' appointment had found out about Ben's prison record in Wyoming, and contacted the Attorney General of the United States. The story of his prison term had also been leaked to the press. The telegrams and letters poured into the White House. These missives either damned him as a gambler, mule thief, and murderer, or praised him as a peace officer and war hero. The pressure finally became too much for the Roosevelt White House. Ben Daniels submitted his resignation on February 25, 1902.

=== Superintendent of Yuma Territorial Penitentiary ===
Angered by the public outcry, President Roosevelt remained determined to do something for Ben Daniels – something that wouldn't require senate confirmation to get one of his favorite Rough Riders on the Federal payroll, Accordingly, the President had another former "Rough Rider," Governor Alexander Oswald Brodie of Arizona, appoint Daniels as Superintendent of the Territorial Penitentiary at Yuma on October 1, 1904. In a note to his close friend Senator Henry Cabot Lodge, President Roosevelt bragged: "By the way, I think it will rejoice your heart to know that Governor Brodie of Arizona (late Lieutenant-Colonel of the Rough Riders) is going to appoint Ben Daniels (late one-eared hero of that organization) as warden of the Arizona Penitentiary. When I told this to John Hay he remarked (with brutal absence of feeling) that he believed the proverb ran: 'Set a Rough Rider to catch a thief!'"

=== United States Marshal for the Territory of Arizona (second appointment) ===
After three years, the scandal caused by Theodore Roosevelt's first attempt to appoint Ben Daniels as U.S. Marshal for Arizona had largely been forgotten. President Roosevelt decided to try a second time, and this time he made it. On July 1, 1905, Ben Daniels was finally appointed, with the advice and consent of the Senate, as the United States Marshal for the Territory of Arizona.

On August 26, 1906, Ben's wife, Annie Laura Daniels, died suddenly while visiting Ben's older sister, Elizabeth (Daniels) Copple in Emporia, Kansas. Annie Laura Daniels was buried at the cemetery in her family's home town of Blue Springs, Missouri. Daniels would not remain a widower for long. On July 15, 1908, Ben married for a second time. His new wife was a 39-year-old widow named Anna Evaline (Stakebake) Seayrs. His new bride, who preferred to be called "Eva" was a schoolteacher who had a 10-year-old daughter by her first marriage.

After President Theodore Roosevelt left office in 1909, Ben Daniels was called to Washington and asked to resign his commission as U.S. Marshal for the Territory of Arizona. While there, he was offered the position of Indian Agent at the Menominee Indian Agency in Green Bay, Wisconsin. Daniels turned the offer down and returned to mining properties that he had in Arizona.

=== Final years ===
During 1914, at the age of sixty-two, Ben Daniels ran on Theodore Roosevelt's Progressive Party ticket for sheriff of Pima County, Arizona and finished a distant third. Two years later, again running on the Progressive ticket, Daniels was again defeated for office. After this second defeat, Ben followed the example of Theodore Roosevelt and rejoined the Republican Party that Roosevelt had bolted in 1912. As a Republican, in 1920, Ben finally was elected sheriff of Pima County, during which time he engaged in a handful of final adventures as a lawman. In May 1922, Daniels and his deputies investigated the robbery of the Golden State Limited outside of Tucson and helped bring several of the culprits to justice in what was to be the last true train robbery in Arizona. Later that year, Daniels was defeated in a bid for re-election. The 70-year-old Daniels quietly went back to working his mining claims.

Ben Daniels died at 1:30 in the afternoon of April 20, 1923. He suffered a massive heart attack while he was seated in his parked automobile in Tucson. He died within the hour. Funeral services were conducted from Daniels' residence at 628 Ninth Avenue in Tucson. Burial was at Evergreen Cemetery.

== Bibliography ==
- DeArment, Robert K. Ballots and Bullets: The Bloody County Seat Wars of Kansas, Norman, OK: University of Oklahoma Press, 2006. ISBN 0-8061-3784-3
- DeArment, Robert K. and DeMattos, Jack. A Rough Ride to Redemption: The Ben Daniels Story, Norman, OK: University of Oklahoma Press, 2010. ISBN 978-0-8061-4112-1
- DeArment, Robert K. and DeMattos, Jack. "A Second Look at Ben Daniels' First Wife," Wild West History Association Journal (Vol. VI, No. 4), August 2013.
- DeMattos, Jack. "Gunfighters of the Real West: Ben Daniels." Real West, September 1979.
- DeMattos, Jack. "Between Pals: A Missive Between Presidential Gunfighters." Quarterly of the National Association for Outlaw and Lawman History (July–September 1993).
- Miller, Nyle H. and Snell, Joseph W. Why the West Was Wild. Topeka: Kansas State Historical Society, 1963.
- Secrest, William B. "Fighting Man." Frontier Times, May 1969.
- Dolan, Samuel K. Cowboys and Gangsters: Stories of an Untamed Southwest (TwoDot Books, 2016) ISBN 978-1-4422-4669-0

== See also ==
- List of Old West lawmen
- American frontier

Police appointments
Preceded by Thomas C. Nixon	Assistant City Marshal of Dodge City, Kansas; 1884–1886	Succeeded by I. J. Collier
Civic offices
Preceded by William M. Griffith	Superintendent of the Yuma Territorial Prison; 1904–1905	Succeeded by Jerry Millay
Police appointments
Preceded by J. T. "Rye" Miles	Sheriff of Pima County, Arizona; 1920–1922	Succeeded by Walter W. Baily
