= Cimarron, Kansas =

City in Gray County, Kansas

- City and County seat
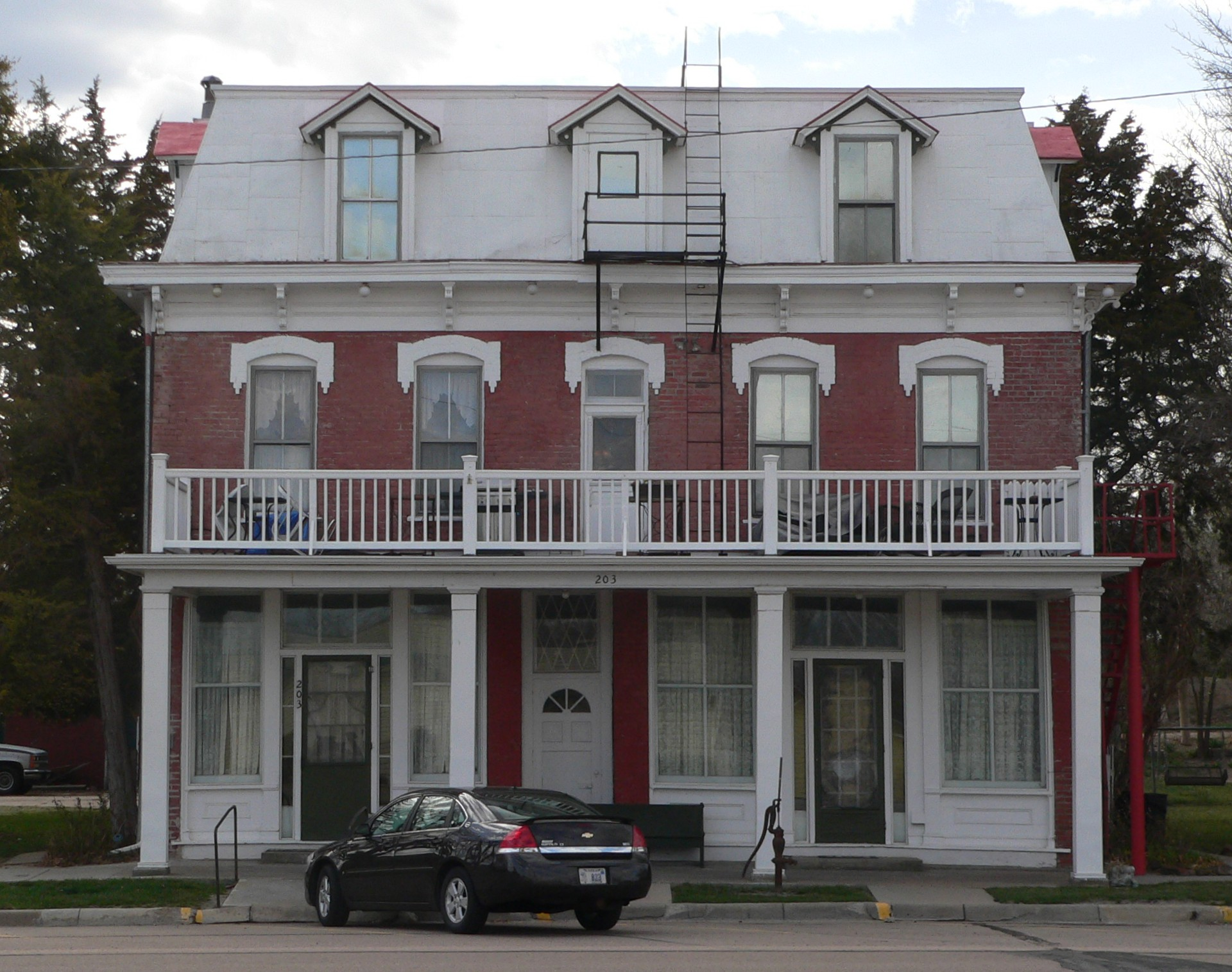
- Historic 1886 Cimarron Hotel

- Flag

- Location within Gray County and Kansas

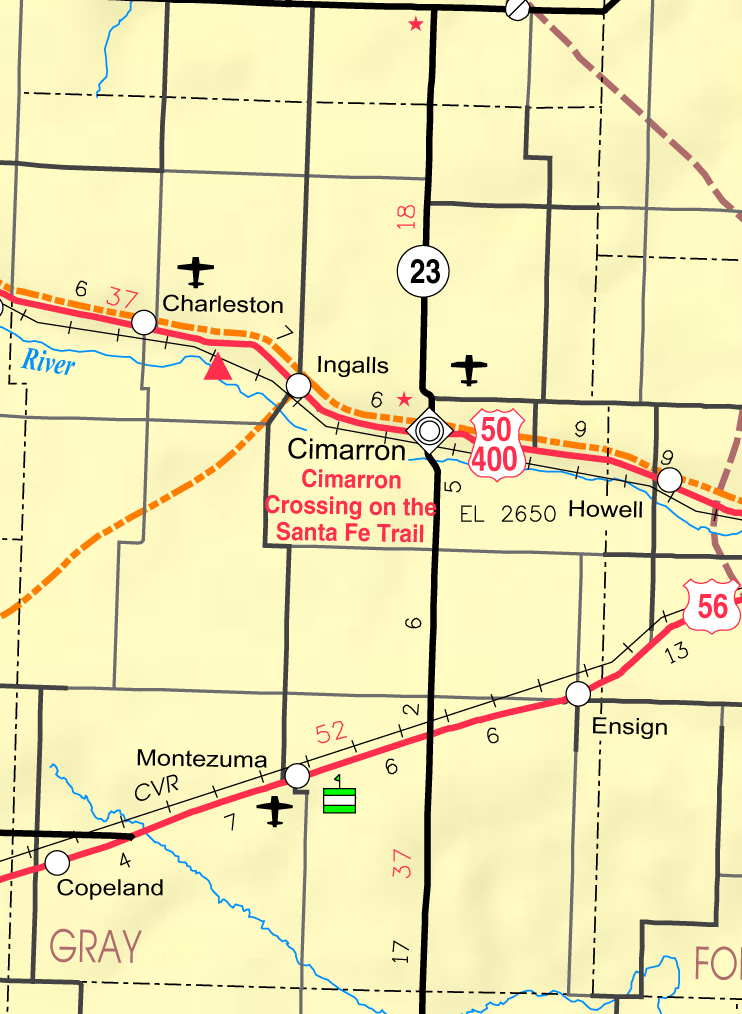
- KDOT map of Gray County (legend)
- Coordinates: 37°48′35″N 100°20′43″W
- Country: United States
- State: Kansas
- County: Gray
- Founded: 1878
- Incorporated: 1885
- Named for: Fork in Chisholm Trail towards Cimarron River

Area
  - Total: 1.15 sq mi (2.98 km^{2})
  - Land: 1.15 sq mi (2.98 km^{2})
  - Water: 0 sq mi (0.00 km^{2})
- Elevation: 2,687 ft (819 m)

Population (2020)
  - Total: 1,981
  - Density: 1,720/sq mi (665/km^{2})
- Time zone: UTC-6 (CST)
  - Summer (DST): UTC-5 (CDT)
- ZIP Code: 67835
- Area code: 620
- FIPS code: 20-13275
- GNIS ID: 2393524
- Website: cimarronks.org

Cimarron is a city in and the county seat of Gray County, Kansas, United States. As of the 2020 census, the population of the city was 1,981. It is located along Highway 50.

== History ==
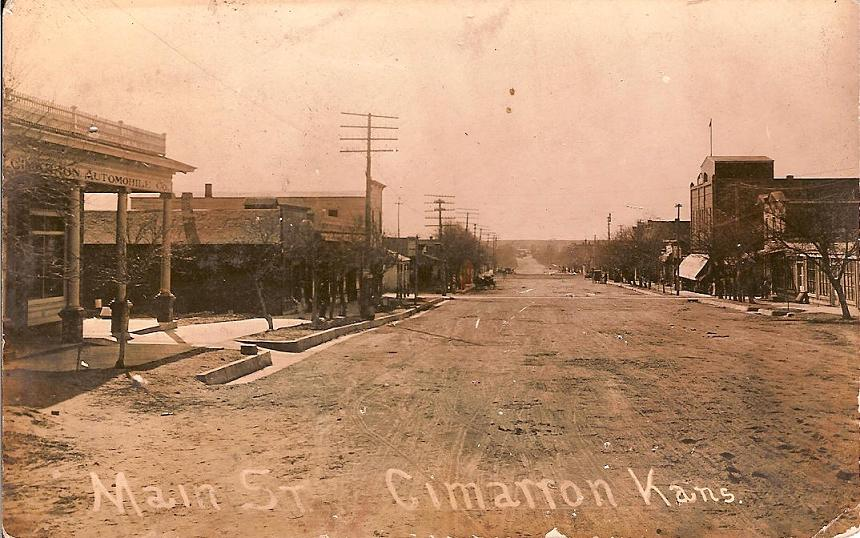
Main Street (1914)

Cimarron was first settled in 1878. It took its name from a fork in the Santa Fe Trail which led travelers to the Cimarron River.

Between 1887 and 1893, a county seat war took place in Gray County that involved several notable Old West figures, such as Bat Masterson, Bill Tilghman, and Ben Daniels. As a result of the dispute, Cimarron became the permanent county seat of Gray County.

In the early morning hours of June 10, 1893, Bill Doolin and four members of his gang robbed a train one-half mile east of Cimarron.

In 2016, the Amtrak Southwest Chief was involved in a collision near Cimarron. The train, en route to Chicago from Los Angeles, derailed on a section of track that was damaged by a runaway truck. 28 people were injured in the derailment, which caused over $1.4 million in damage. The tracks were knocked out of alignment the morning before the derailment when a fully loaded truck from Cimarron Crossing Feeders, an adjacent business, ran out of control down a hill leading to the tracks. The truck was removed, but the incident was not reported to local authorities or BNSF, the owner of the tracks.

== Geography ==
According to the United States Census Bureau, the city has a total area of 1.14 square miles (2.95 km^{2}), all of it land.

=== Climate ===
According to the Köppen Climate Classification system, Cimarron has a semi-arid climate, abbreviated "BSk" on climate maps.

Climate data for Cimarron, Kansas, 1991–2020 normals, extremes 1911–present
Month	Jan	Feb	Mar	Apr	May	Jun	Jul	Aug	Sep	Oct	Nov	Dec	Year
Record high °F (°C)	80 (27)	89 (32)	99 (37)	99 (37)	106 (41)	110 (43)	111 (44)	111 (44)	115 (46)	100 (38)	92 (33)	86 (30)	115 (46)
Mean maximum °F (°C)	67.8 (19.9)	74.0 (23.3)	83.2 (28.4)	89.3 (31.8)	95.0 (35.0)	100.1 (37.8)	102.8 (39.3)	100.8 (38.2)	98.2 (36.8)	92.0 (33.3)	78.2 (25.7)	67.3 (19.6)	103.8 (39.9)
Mean daily maximum °F (°C)	44.6 (7.0)	48.5 (9.2)	58.6 (14.8)	67.6 (19.8)	77.6 (25.3)	87.7 (30.9)	92.8 (33.8)	90.2 (32.3)	83.4 (28.6)	70.6 (21.4)	56.7 (13.7)	45.7 (7.6)	68.7 (20.4)
Daily mean °F (°C)	31.5 (−0.3)	34.8 (1.6)	44.4 (6.9)	53.5 (11.9)	64.2 (17.9)	74.7 (23.7)	79.8 (26.6)	77.4 (25.2)	69.6 (20.9)	56.2 (13.4)	43.0 (6.1)	32.8 (0.4)	55.2 (12.9)
Mean daily minimum °F (°C)	18.3 (−7.6)	21.1 (−6.1)	30.2 (−1.0)	39.4 (4.1)	50.9 (10.5)	61.7 (16.5)	66.8 (19.3)	64.6 (18.1)	55.9 (13.3)	41.9 (5.5)	29.3 (−1.5)	20.0 (−6.7)	41.7 (5.4)
Mean minimum °F (°C)	1.2 (−17.1)	4.2 (−15.4)	11.7 (−11.3)	23.2 (−4.9)	35.5 (1.9)	48.7 (9.3)	56.1 (13.4)	54.6 (12.6)	40.0 (4.4)	24.0 (−4.4)	11.7 (−11.3)	2.6 (−16.3)	−4.2 (−20.1)
Record low °F (°C)	−20 (−29)	−19 (−28)	−19 (−28)	7 (−14)	26 (−3)	34 (1)	43 (6)	41 (5)	25 (−4)	8 (−13)	−7 (−22)	−21 (−29)	−21 (−29)
Average precipitation inches (mm)	0.56 (14)	0.60 (15)	1.43 (36)	1.82 (46)	2.75 (70)	3.49 (89)	3.23 (82)	2.96 (75)	1.33 (34)	1.87 (47)	0.67 (17)	0.90 (23)	21.61 (548)
Average snowfall inches (cm)	3.9 (9.9)	3.8 (9.7)	3.1 (7.9)	0.7 (1.8)	0.1 (0.25)	0.0 (0.0)	0.0 (0.0)	0.0 (0.0)	0.0 (0.0)	0.5 (1.3)	1.4 (3.6)	3.8 (9.7)	17.3 (44.15)
Average precipitation days (≥ 0.01 in)	2.7	3.4	4.7	6.0	8.1	7.9	6.8	7.3	4.6	5.1	3.1	3.7	63.4
Average snowy days (≥ 0.1 in)	2.0	2.2	1.5	0.4	0.0	0.0	0.0	0.0	0.0	0.3	0.9	2.4	9.7
Source 1: NOAA
Source 2: National Weather Service

== Demographics ==
Historical population
Census	Pop.	Note	%±
1900	237		—
1910	587		147.7%
1920	599		2.0%
1930	1,035		72.8%
1940	1,004		−3.0%
1950	1,189		18.4%
1960	1,115		−6.2%
1970	1,373		23.1%
1980	1,491		8.6%
1990	1,626		9.1%
2000	1,934		18.9%
2010	2,184		12.9%
2020	1,981		−9.3%
U.S. Decennial Census

=== 2020 census ===
As of the 2020 census, Cimarron had a population of 1,981 people, with 745 households and 526 families. The population density was 1,719.6 per square mile (663.9/km^{2}). There were 829 housing units at an average density of 719.6 per square mile (277.8/km^{2}). 0.0% of residents lived in urban areas, while 100.0% lived in rural areas.

The median age was 37.1 years. 29.6% of residents were under the age of 18, 6.3% were from 18 to 24, 25.0% were from 25 to 44, 22.0% were from 45 to 64, and 17.1% were 65 years of age or older. For every 100 females there were 100.3 males, and for every 100 females age 18 and over there were 98.9 males age 18 and over.

There were 745 households, of which 38.7% had children under the age of 18 living in them. Of all households, 58.7% were married-couple households, 17.6% were households with a male householder and no spouse or partner present, and 19.9% were households with a female householder and no spouse or partner present. About 25.8% of all households were made up of individuals and 10.1% had someone living alone who was 65 years of age or older. There were 829 housing units, of which 10.1% were vacant. The homeowner vacancy rate was 1.8% and the rental vacancy rate was 12.7%.

Racial composition as of the 2020 census
Race	Number	Percent
White	1,591	80.3%
Black or African American	12	0.6%
American Indian and Alaska Native	13	0.7%
Asian	8	0.4%
Native Hawaiian and Other Pacific Islander	0	0.0%
Some other race	151	7.6%
Two or more races	206	10.4%
Hispanic or Latino (of any race)	405	20.4%

The non-Hispanic White population was 75.06% of the total population.

Households and housing

The average household size was 2.7 and the average family size was 3.1.

Education

The percent of those with a bachelor's degree or higher was estimated to be 23.9% of the population.

Income and poverty

The 2016–2020 5-year American Community Survey estimates show that the median household income was $93,125 (with a margin of error of +/- $16,215) and the median family income was $94,907 (+/- $5,560). Males had a median income of $49,803 (+/- $8,036) versus $33,262 (+/- $7,728) for females. The median income for those above 16 years old was $42,536 (+/- $4,435). Approximately, 4.9% of families and 5.0% of the population were below the poverty line, including 5.7% of those under the age of 18 and 2.5% of those ages 65 or over.

=== 2010 census ===
As of the census of 2010, there were 2,184 people, 789 households, and 569 families residing in the city. The population density was 1,915.8 inhabitants per square mile (739.7/km^{2}). There were 842 housing units at an average density of 738.6 per square mile (285.2/km^{2}). The racial makeup of the city was 92.2% White, 0.1% African American, 0.5% Native American, 0.4% Asian, 5.4% from other races, and 1.3% from two or more races. Hispanic or Latino of any race were 19.1% of the population.

There were 789 households, of which 41.7% had children under the age of 18 living with them, 58.2% were married couples living together, 10.8% had a female householder with no husband present, 3.2% had a male householder with no wife present, and 27.9% were non-families. 24.3% of all households were made up of individuals, and 9.9% had someone living alone who was 65 years of age or older. The average household size was 2.73 and the average family size was 3.27.

The median age in the city was 33.6 years. 32.3% of residents were under the age of 18; 6.1% were between the ages of 18 and 24; 26% were from 25 to 44; 24% were from 45 to 64; and 11.5% were 65 years of age or older. The gender makeup of the city was 48.8% male and 51.2% female.

== Education ==
The community is served by Cimarron–Ensign USD 102 public school district.

== Transportation ==
- Cimarron Municipal Airport

== Notable people ==
- Ian Campbell, former defensive end for Kansas State University
- Nicholas Klaine, journalist (editor of the Dodge City Times and New West Echo), built the Cimarron Hotel

== See also ==
- Battle of Cimarron
- Cimarron Hotel
- Old Gray County Courthouse
- Santa Fe Trail
