= Gray County War =

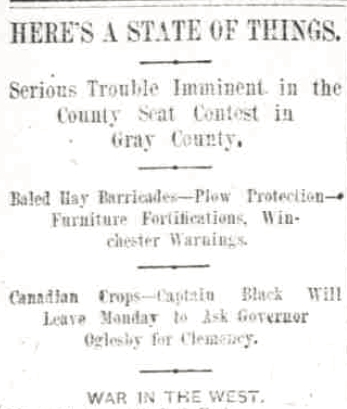
- The headline of a Wichita Daily Eagle article warning of violence in Gray County following the county seat election in 1887.
- Date: 1887–1893
- Location: Gray County, Kansas, USA
- Also known as: Gray County Seat War
- Participants: Bat Masterson, Jim Masterson, Bill Tilghman, Ben Daniels
- Outcome: Cimarron becomes the permanent county seat.
- Deaths: 1

The Gray County War was a county seat war in Gray County, Kansas, between 1887 and 1893.

== See also ==
- List of feuds in the United States
- Battle of Cimarron
