= Killing of Jose Guerena =

2011 fatal law enforcement incident

- Location: Tucson, Arizona, United States
- Date: 5 May 2011; 15 years ago 9:30 am (MST)
- Attack type: Shooting
- Deaths: 1
- Injuries: 0
- Victim: Jose Guerena
- Perpetrator: Pima County Sheriff's Department SWAT deputies

Jose Guerena (also spelled Guereña) was a U.S. Marine veteran who served in the Iraq War and who was killed in his Tucson, Arizona, home on May 5, 2011, by the Pima County Sheriff's Department SWAT team. Deputies were executing a warrant to search Guerena's home while investigating a case involving marijuana being smuggled into the U.S. from Mexico.

The shooting garnered national attention and generated significant debate on the subject of the militarization of police in conjunction with the following facts in the case: After the shooting, no evidence of illegal activity nor any illegal items were found at Guerena's residence; Guerena's wife and 4-year-old child were hiding within the home from whom they thought were intruders when deputies opened fire with a salvo of 71 rounds; Guerena's weapon was found with its safety still engaged; Guerena's prior military service and lack of any criminal record; Inconsistencies in statements given by officials describing what had transpired at the scene.

In September 2013, the four police agencies involved agreed to pay Guerena's wife and children $3.4 million as a settlement, without admitting wrongdoing in their killing of Guerena.

== Background ==
Jose Manuel Guerena Ortiz was originally from Nogales, Sonora, Mexico, immigrating to the United States at age 13. He graduated Flowing Wells High School and joined the United States Marine Corps in 2002, serving two tours of duties in Iraq in 2003 and 2005, being honorably discharged from service in 2006. Guerena had been turned down for a position in United States Border Patrol due to vision problems, instead taking up work in the copper mining industry.

=== Reasons for search ===
The Pima County Sheriff's Department initially said the raid was part of a drug investigation. Days later, they provided details that it was part of an investigation into a series of home invasions and drug rip-offs. Another home searched that same morning revealed marijuana, $94,000, and several weapons. According to legal documents, the Guerena home was among several homes that were identified as locations where these illegal activities were being carried out from. The search warrant was to gather evidence of these activities. According to police reports, Alejandro Guerena pulled up to the house in a pick-up truck while the raid was going on, and police found a pistol in his truck, which might have led to a heavier firearm presence when raiding Jose's home.

== Incident ==
Asleep after returning from a 12-hour overnight shift at the ASARCO Mission mine, Guerena was awakened about 9:30 a.m. by his wife who heard noises outside their house, later identified as flash/bang grenades deployed by police in the back yard as a diversion. He instructed his wife and 4-year-old son to hide inside a closet while he grabbed his AR-15 rifle and crouched down preparing to defend himself from the unidentified people breaking into his home. The Sheriff's Department initially claimed that Guerena had fired on officers; at least three of the SWAT members including the team commander reported in their post-operation debriefings that they had observed muzzle flashes aimed at them from inside the house. After an examination of Guerena's rifle however, it was determined that the rifle had not been fired; the safety was still engaged. Other officers claimed they saw splinters from the doorjamb being hit by bullets; the shots that caused this were determined to come from other members of the SWAT team themselves. "There were five officers at the door beginning to make entry into this home, when they engaged this individual that they believed was actually firing at them." Other versions of this story claim that officers started shooting after Guerena pointed the gun at them, though under questioning they were initially unsure whether he had actually moved to target them. A video of the raid shows roughly 38 seconds expired from the time the police briefly sounded a siren upon pulling into Guerena's driveway until they shot him. At this point the five person team fired at least 71 rounds at Guerena in less than seven seconds, who died after being hit 22 times.

Guerena's wife called 911 to request medical assistance for her husband shortly after the shooting. Paramedics, however, were instructed to hold back per standard procedure in shootings. Guerena was denied attention, for about one hour, until the team declared the "area secured". Ambulance crews were then notified they were no longer needed, one hour and fourteen minutes after Guerena's wife's call to 911. An official autopsy report was released on 6 June. It confirmed that Guerena had been shot 22 times, including one grazing shot to the head. No drugs were found in his system. The medical examiner expressed doubts that medics could have saved Guerena, even if they had reached him quickly. The report also notes that the body showed "no evidence of medical intervention".

The former U.S. Army Staff Sergeant Anthony Schiessl was asked to review a video from the raid. Schiessl has seven years of experience as an Army Combat Engineer, including three deployments to Iraq. Schiessl said the raid was "amateur, undisciplined, unrehearsed and ineffective." He was then asked if Guerena could have known they were cops raiding the house, he replied "Not plausible at all. The short siren burst could have been a police car passing. The flash bang grenades being used next door would have added to the confusion. When looking out a sunlit doorway from a dark hallway, it is difficult to see anything but a silhouette. Add in several people yelling, and it would be extremely difficult to comprehend what is happening if you're woken from sleep."

While officers did not find any evidence of drug trafficking, they did find multiple weapons including one AR-15, one .38 handgun, body armor, and a US Border Patrol hat. They also found a portrait of Jesus Malverde, commonly known as a "narco saint" under Guerena's bed. Three other houses and a storage unit rented by his relatives were searched as part of the same investigation, in which police discovered weapons, a bag of marijuana, a stolen vehicle, and accounting ledgers allegedly related to marijuana trafficking operations.

== Aftermath ==
Guerena's body was returned to his native Mexico, where he was buried in Oquitoa.

A computer search revealed Guerena had no history of criminal convictions. Guerena had been arrested in January 2009 after being involved in a traffic stop with two other individuals where a gun and a small amount of marijuana were found, but was not charged. In the affidavit filed to support the search warrant, Pima Detective Alex Tisch had claimed that Guerena had "five felony arrests involving drugs" but no convictions.

Guerena's widow states that she had no knowledge that the man she saw pointing a gun at her through the window was a police officer, and thought that he was part of a home invasion group. She has stated that two members of her sister-in-law's family were killed previously in a home invasion. As of May 2011, that case, in which Cynthia and Manny Orozco were killed and their 2-year-old daughter seriously injured, remains unsolved.

Upon request of Pima County Sheriff Clarence Dupnik, a judge sealed the search warrants as well as the documents showing what items were seized from the home. Dupnik stated this was to protect the identity of a confidential informant and criticized the press for wanting to know the details of the case. On June 2, 2011, the Pima County Superior Court released the warrants and other information related to the raid, but redacted some material to protect the identity of a confidential informant.

Days after the shooting, the family retained Tucson attorney Christopher Scileppi. Scileppi was critical of the investigation leading up to the requesting of a search warrant, claiming that probable cause did not exist as to Jose Guerena. Scileppi was also critical of the militarization of law enforcement and claimed that they were negligent in executing the warrant.

Attorney Michael Storie, the Pima County Deputy Sheriff's Association's in-house counsel represented the officers involved in a number of press conferences defending their actions. On June 13, the Pima County Attorney's Office, under County Attorney Barbara LaWall, released the results of their review of the shooting, concluding that "under the circumstances, and based upon our review of all the available evidence, we have concluded that the use of deadly forces by the SWAT Team members was reasonable and justified under the law. Accordingly, the Pima County Attorney's Office finds no basis to prosecute."

Pima County Republican Party chairman Brian Miller questioned the killing of Guerena, and the SWAT policies that led to it, as did former Graham County Sheriff Richard Mack, who once served with Dupnik. The Pima County GOP, upset that Brian Miller rushed to criticize the shooting, and in light of the facts that were later revealed to clear the officers of wrongdoing, removed Brian Miller from his chairmanship.

Ten months after the raids and the killing, on March 2, 2012, Guerena's two brothers Alejandro Guerena, 28, and Gerardo Guerena, 24; along with Alejandro's wife, Pauline Guerena, his sister-in-law, Denise Ruiz, and his father-in-law, Jose Celaya were indicted, and it was alleged that they imported and sold at least $4.9 million worth of marijuana between 2005 and the time of the fatal raid. Alejandro Guerena, the alleged leader of the smuggling operation, was arrested in Mexico, returned to Pima County, and on June 25, 2013, was sentenced to 105 days in jail plus five years of probation after pleading guilty to attempted possession of marijuana for sale and conspiracy to commit money laundering. Denise Ruiz pleaded guilty to facilitation of possession of marijuana for sale and received an identical sentence to Alejandro. Pauline Guerena and Gerardo Guerena each pleaded guilty to one count of attempted money laundering in the second degree, and were each sentenced to four years probation. Celaya posted a $50,000 bond after his arrest, but the resolution of his charges are unknown.

== Lawsuit ==
On August 12, 2011, it was announced that the family of Jose Guerena filed an intention to sue Pima County Sheriff Dupnik, and all the officers who shot Guerena or were part of the raid, offering to settle for $20 million. The lawsuit cites that the officers acted with negligence when they failed to announce themselves and put Guerena's wife and son in danger, and willingly deprived Guerena of medical attention after he was shot, leading to his death, and violated his civil rights. Christopher Scileppi and Pat Broom, Tucson attorneys, were hired to represent the family. Scileppi says the lawsuit is meant to hold those accountable for Guerena's death and send a message to officers who have unlawfully killed citizens, as well as to clear Jose Guerena's name. The lawyer for the officers, however, said that the lawsuit is only to cause more "hysteria" and the amount is excessive since the officers had already been cleared of wrongdoing, while also admitting that, had officers been peacefully allowed into the home, everyone inside "probably ... wouldn't have been arrested."

Initially the parties involved in killing Guerena did not settle, so the family proceeded to file a lawsuit. The suit named Pima County, Marana, Sahuarita, Oro Valley, and all SWAT operators involved in the killing. The suit covers claims of negligence in the procurement of the search warrant, in the shooting, and in the failure to provide medical attention.

In September 2013, Pima County, the towns of Sahuarita, Marana, and Oro Valley, approved a combined settlement of $3.4 million to Guerena's widow, with Pima County contributing $2.35 million, Sahuarita, $260,000, Marana, $720,000, and Oro Valley, $100,000. The settlements required approval from each jurisdictions board, with only one board member from Pima county dissenting. Pima County officials claim that the settlement does not imply wrongdoing.

== See also ==
- Berwyn Heights, Maryland mayor's residence drug raid
- List of killings by law enforcement officers in the United States, May 2011
