= 2016 Cimarron train derailment =

Rail accident in Kansas, United States

Cimarron train derailment
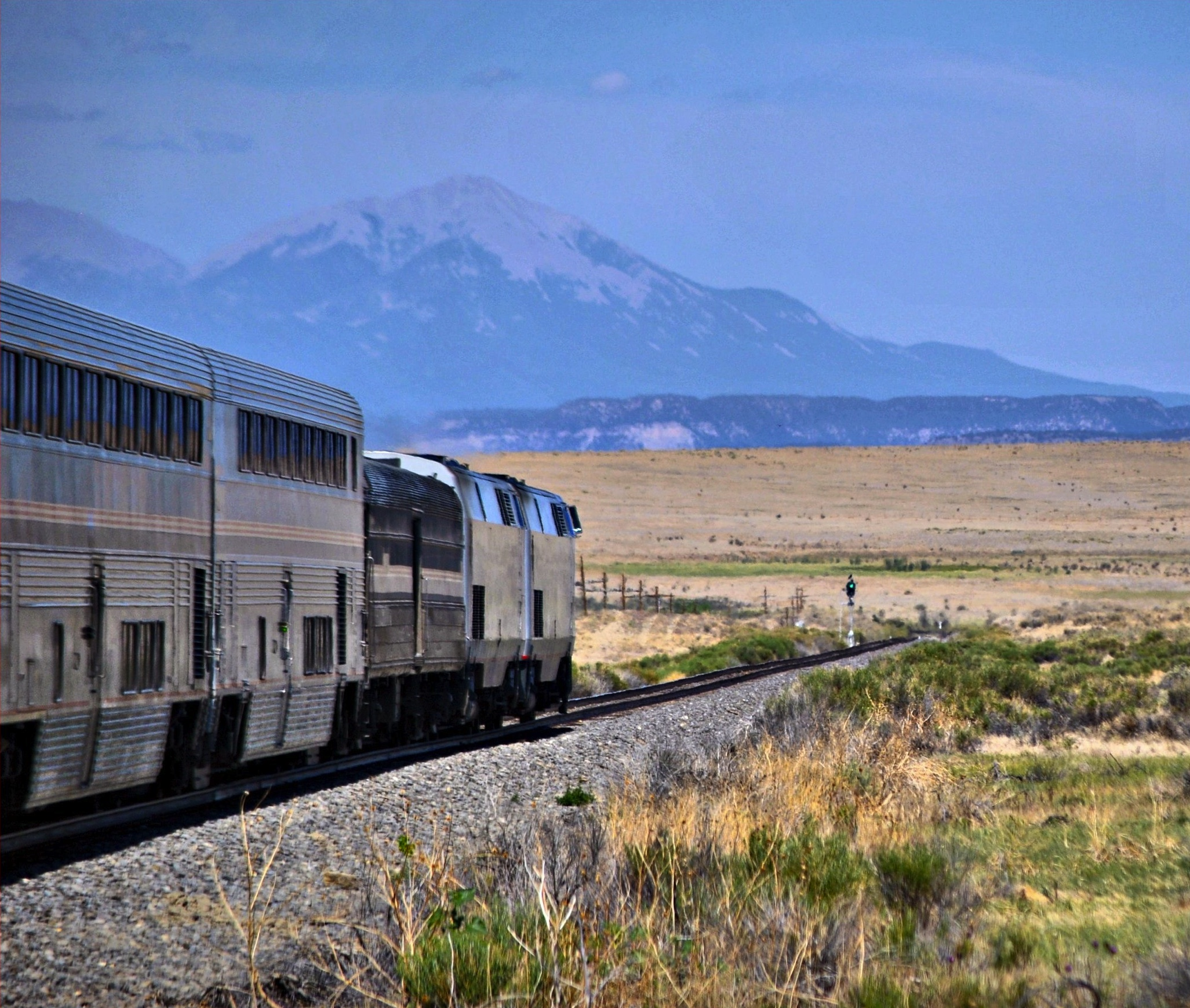
- Southwest Chief heading west toward Trinidad, Colorado; Sangre de Cristo Range in the distance.

Details
- Date: March 14, 2016; 10 years ago 12:02 a.m. local time (5:02 UTC)
- Location: Cimarron, Kansas
- Coordinates: 37.808598°N 100.381975°W
- Country: United States
- Line: BNSF
- Operator: Amtrak
- Incident type: Derailment
- Cause: Track displaced by runaway Road Truck.

Statistics
- Trains: 1
- Vehicles: 1
- Passengers: 130
- Crew: 14
- Injured: 28 (including 2 critically)
- Damage: more than $1.4 million

The Cimarron train derailment occurred on March 14, 2016, when Amtrak's Southwest Chief derailed about 20 miles (32 km) west of Dodge City in Kansas, United States. Twenty-eight people were injured, including two critically.

== Accident ==
The accident occurred at 12:02 a.m. local time (5:02 UTC) when Amtrak's Southwest Chief derailed, with four cars falling onto their sides and two others derailing yet remaining upright. The remaining four cars stayed on the rails, as did the 2 locomotives which were pulling the train. The train was traveling from Los Angeles to Chicago and was near Cimarron, Kansas. It was traveling at 60 miles per hour (97 km/h) when it derailed. The train cars consisted of 2 P42DC locomotives, baggage car, one Superliner transition sleeping car, two Superliner sleeping cars, a Superliner dining car, a Superliner lounge car, and three Superliner coach cars.

There were 130 passengers and 14 crew on board the train. Of those, 28 were injured. Three of them remained hospitalized for more than 24 hours, including two people who were critically hurt and later airlifted to Amarillo, Texas. The rest were released the same evening as the accident. One of the airlifted victims was the percussionist and experimental musician Z'EV, a pioneer of industrial music. After the accident, he continued having health problems and died in December 2017.

After the accident, passengers waited about 12 hours in Cimarron at the 4-H recreation center where cots and blankets were set up. Food was provided by local restaurants. They then boarded buses to Kansas City and transferred to a Chicago bound train.

== Investigations ==
The National Transportation Safety Board launched an investigation into the accident. The Gray County sheriff's deputy said that there was a separate vehicle accident that may have damaged the rails, and authorities were examining tire tracks leading to the train tracks and preserving the scene with crime scene tape. Later reports said that an agricultural vehicle damaged the track prior to the train's derailment, 25 feet (7.6 m) from impact. The tracks were displaced 12 to 14 inches (300–360 mm) by the impact. This displacement of the tracks could be seen in the video recorded by the camera on the locomotive.

On April 5, 2016, the NTSB released a preliminary report about the accident. It focused on the apparent collision of the feed truck into the railroad track. Tire tracks in the ground by the displaced railroad track matched the tires on a 2004 Kenworth International truck at a local feed lot owned by Cimarron Crossing Feeders, LLC.

== Aftermath ==
On April 8, 2016, a lawsuit was filed by Amtrak and BNSF against Cimarron Crossing Feeders, LLC. It alleges employees of Cimarron Crossing Feeders left a Kenworth truck "unattended, out of gear, and without any brakes applied" while loading grain March 13 into March 14. According to the lawsuit, the truck from the Cimarron facility rolled downhill to the south, crossing U.S. Highway 50 and striking the side of the railroad tracks. The truck then came to rest on the tracks. According to the lawsuit, Cimarron Crossing Feeders then called for a tow truck to remove the Kenworth "without permission or consent from BNSF," which owns the tracks.

The initial filing states that damages claimed are over $75,000 for each of BNSF and Amtrak. It also states that a specific employee of Cimarron Crossing Feeders, Arturo Carrillo, was working on loading the truck involved in the incident. It also claims that Cimarron should have known that the damage to the track was a danger and yet they did not call Amtrak, BNSF or any law enforcement agencies.

A liability trial was cancelled on November 28, 2018, after Cimarron Crossing Feeders admitted that its truck had caused track damage.

== See also ==
- List of rail accidents (2010–2019)
