= Nicholas B. Klaine =

American politician

Nicholas Benjamin Klaine (February 5, 1839 – February 24, 1927) was an American politician, businessman, and journalist.

== Early life ==
He was born in Bordentown, New Jersey. He came with his parents to Rock Island, Illinois, in 1851, where he lived until 1859. He then moved to St. Louis, Missouri He enlisted in August 1862, in Company K, Tenth Missouri Cavalry. he was commissioned Second Lieutenant. and commanded his company one year. He participated in all the battles of his command and was mustered out in May, 1864. He went to Warrensburg, Missouri, in 1865, and began the publication of the Warrensburg Standard, which he continued for ten years. He served both as City Clerk and City Councilman. He represented Johnson County, Missouri, in the State Legislature (1869–1870) and was Supervisor of Registration of Johnson County (1866).

Klaine arrived in Dodge City, Kansas in November 1877, engaged as a journalist. He became the editor and proprietor of the Dodge City Times, a newspaper established on May 20, 1876. On January 23, 1883, he took charge of the Dodge City post office by appointment. He served as Probate Judge of Ford County, in 1879–80; City Treasurer of Dodge City in 1882, and also as Constable, City Treasurer and School Director.

In 1886, Klaine built a hotel in Cimarron, Kansas at an investment of $15,000 (equivalent to $537,000 in 2025). With the completion of the first floor of the three-story brick structure, he launched the New West Echo, a Republican newspaper that ceased publication when Klaine left the region in 1902. The newspaper occupied the north half of the first floor of the hotel. Klaine sold the hotel in 1902 to the Luther family. The hotel still exists and is now called the Cimarron Hotel.

== Personal life ==
He was married in August, 1859, to Miss Julia Kinkaid, a native of Missouri.

== Death ==
He died of toxemia in 1927 in Hot Springs, Arkansas.
