= Cimarron Hotel =

- U.S. National Register of Historic Places
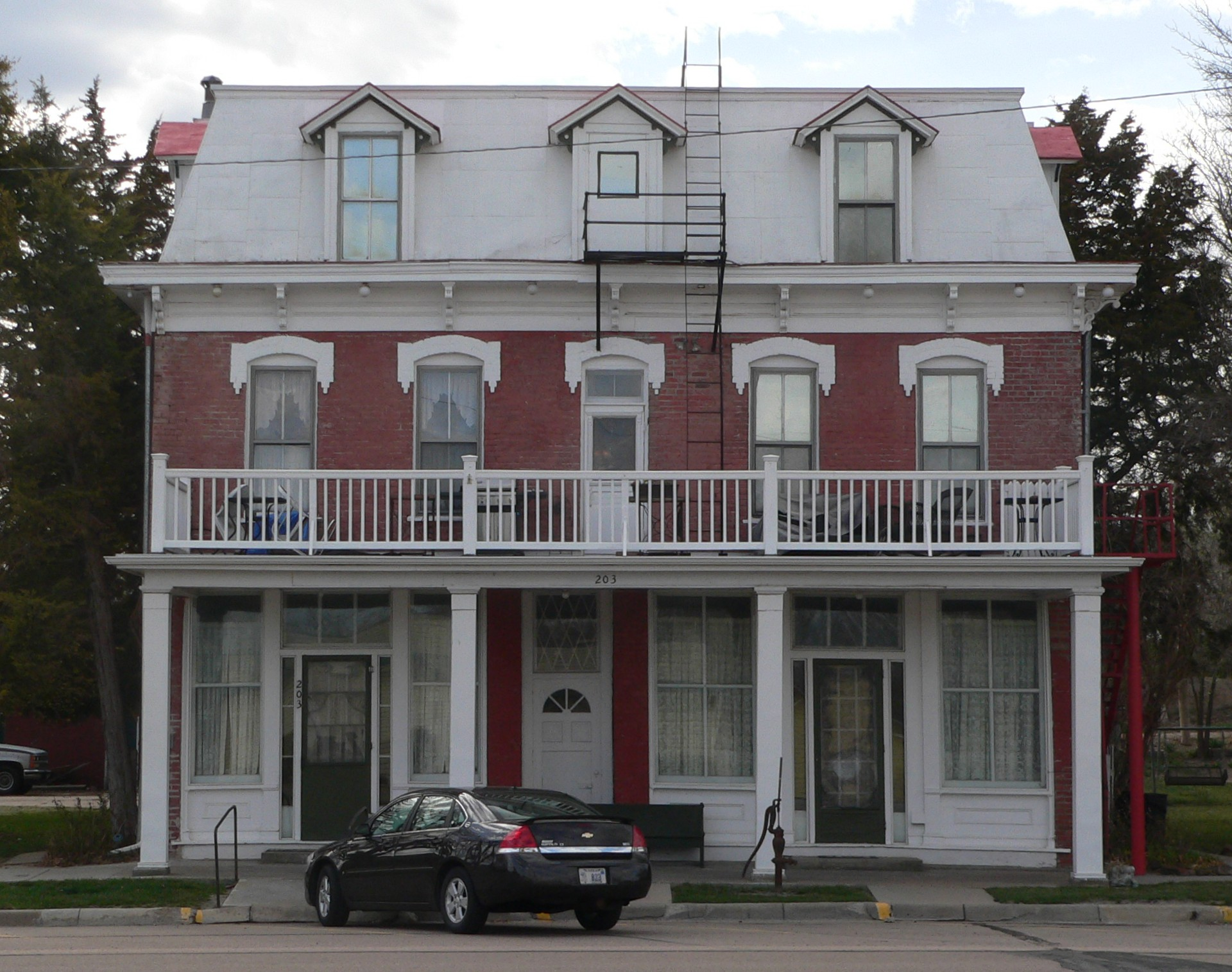

- Location within Kansas Location within the United States
- Location: Cimarron, KS
- Coordinates: 37.808188°N 100.348456°W
- Built: 1886
- Architect: John Opp
- Architectural style: Second Empire
- Website: www.oldwestproperty.com
- NRHP reference No.: 83000428
- Added to NRHP: February 10, 1983

The Cimarron Hotel is a historic hotel located in Cimarron, a small town located in southwest Kansas, United States.

The hotel is a three-story Second Empire-style building, about 43 by 79 feet (13 m × 24 m) in plan, with five bays across the front and eight bays deep.

== History ==
The hotel was built by Nicholas B. Klaine in 1886, at an investment of $15,000. With the completion of the first floor of the three-story brick structure, he launched the New West Echo, a Republican newspaper. The newspaper occupied the north half of the first floor of the hotel. The hotel opened as the New West Hotel and operated as one of seven serving pioneers who needed to come to town for supplies or for cowboys and ruffians who literally wanted to "get the heck out of Dodge."

Despite several severe economic depressions and droughts in the late 19th century, Klaine continued to operate the Cimarron Hotel under several managers, until 1902. In that year, the New West Echo ceased publication and Klaine sold the hotel to the Luther family. The name was changed to "The Luther Inn." The Luther family owned the hotel until 1947 when they sold the hotel to Else Bartlow, who had been the secretary at the hotel. She changed the name to the "Cimarron Hotel." In 1977, the hotel was purchased by Kathleen Holt.

In the 1980s, the hotel underwent substantial renovations and became a restaurant, bed and breakfast lodging, and private home to the owner and her family. The building was added to the National Register of Historic Places in 1983. As of August 2007, a portion of the building was occupied by a quilt shop that also conducted quilting classes and seminars. The third floor of the building still comprised overnight quarters for guests.

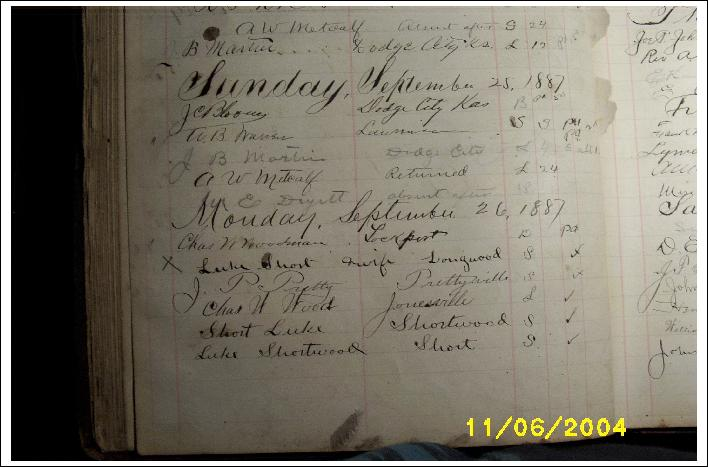
The "Luke Short" entry in the 1887 hotel register
