= List of killings by law enforcement officers in the United States, May 2011 =

This is a list of people reported killed by non-military law enforcement officers in the United States in May 2011, whether in the line of duty or not, and regardless of reason or method. The listing documents the occurrence of a death, making no implications regarding wrongdoing or justification on the part of the person killed or officer involved. Killings are arranged by date of the incident that caused death. Different death dates, if known, are noted in the description. The table below lists 52 people.

== May 2011 ==
Date	Name (Age) of Deceased	Race	State (city)	Description
2011-05-31	Anthony Alberto Ponce (29)	White	Texas (Beeville)	
2011-05-31	Calvin Cross (19)	Black	Illinois (Chicago)	
2011-05-30	Byron Elliot Carter Jr. (20)	Black	Texas (Austin)	Carter was a passenger in a car that police say sped toward and hit an officer. Another officer fired at the car, injuring the driver and killing Carter. A civil suit filed by Carter's family was still in the courts as of May 2013.
2011-05-30	Jennifer Louise Carter Agee (30)	White	Virginia (Roanoke)	
2011-05-30	Raymond Herisse (22)	Black	Florida (Miami Beach)	Shot in vehicle after striking multiple officers and other vehicles with vehicle. Police were in the area due to annual Urban Beach Week celebration.
2011-05-30	Michael Minick (39)	Race unspecified	Tennessee (Nashville)	
2011-05-29	Merlyn Arthur "Mike" King (32)	Race unspecified	California (Yucca Valley)	
2011-05-29	Rodolfo "Rudy" Medrano (35)	Hispanic/Latino	California (Bakersfield)	About 9:30 p.m. Madrano called 911 from his motel room, threatening suicide. He claimed to have several guns. Four deputies from the Kern County Sheriff's Department responded. The deputies negotiated with Medrano for about 45 minutes while he was in his wheelchair in the motel parking lot and holding a large knife. When he charged the deputies, in his wheelchair, with the knife in his hand, the four deputies shot and killed him. In June 2011, the Kern County Sheriff's Incident Review Board ruled the shooting justified.
2011-05-28	Adrian Quevedo (25)	Hispanic/Latino	Tucson, Arizona	
2011-05-27	Alberto Castillo (35)	Hispanic/Latino	Nevada(Las Vegas)	Police responded to a 911 call and found Castillo holding a silver object to his wife's neck. Castillo allegedly kicked an officer and grabbed his Taser, and the officer shot Castillo to death.
2011-05-27	Roxanne Taylor (58)	White	Georgia (DeKalb)	Shot after car chase and firing a shot. Police were pursuing Taylor as the prime suspect in recent armed robberies of stores.
2011-05-26	William Jimmy Page Jr. (39)	White	Florida (St. Petersburg)	
2011-05-25	Donald Ray Moore (64)	Black	North Carolina (Winston-Salem)	
2011-05-25	Willie Danelle Gibbons (33)	Black	New Jersey (Bridgeton)	
2011-05-25	Jonathan Montano (65)	Hispanic/Latino	California (Loma Linda)	
2011-05-25	Tatioun Williams (15)	Black	Illinois (Chicago)	
2011-05-25	Christopher Coronel (21)	Hispanic/Latino	California (South Gate)	
2011-05-25	William Lusk (19)	Hispanic/Latino	California (Los Angeles)	
2011-05-24	Antonio "Tony" L. Cooks (32)	Black	Florida (Jacksonville)	
2011-05-24	Paul Ryan Robbins (60)	White	Texas (Washington)	
2011-05-24	Jeremy Dee Atkinson (38)	White	California (Modesto)	
2011-05-23	Stacey Lee Burris (46)	White	Texas (Fort Worth)	
2011-05-23	Terrence Boatwright (18)	Race unspecified	Florida (Lauderdale Lakes)	
2011-05-22	Spencer Everett Posey (34)	Native American	Colorado (Towaoc)	
2011-05-20	William "Corey" Jackson (33)	Black	New York (Geneva)	Fatally shot during a traffic stop. Was wanted after allegedly stealing $150, a cell phone, and a pack of cigarettes at knifepoint that morning. Jackson was in the backseat of a two door car. Officer saw Jackson reaching around on the floor and thought he observed a gun. A knife and two cell phones were found in the car. Jackson died two days later at a hospital in Rochester, NY.
2011-05-19	Matthew R. Murdock (34)	White	Georgia (Mableton)	Shot after scuffling with police officer and when it appeared Murdock was reaching for a weapon. Police had stopped Murdock as a "suspicious person".
2011-05-19	Shelly Dianne Naroian (47)	White	Hillsboro, New Hampshire	
2011-05-18	Timothy Steven Morris (33)	White	Georgia (Newton County)	Shot after threatening to kill officer while having his hands in his pockets. A state trooper had attempted to stop Morris for speeding. Morris abandoned his vehicle and fled into a heavily wooded area where the trooper cornered him. Knives were found on Morris.
2011-05-18	Ross Steven Nager (18)	White	Washington (Selah)	Shot after exiting vehicle with shotgun or rifle in hand. Police were responding to report that Nager was making threats to people inside a home and firing his weapon. After SWAT team arrive Nager attempted to leave in a vehicle but was blocked.
2011-05-16	Albert "Bert" Reeves (40)	White	South Carolina (Cottageville)	Shot during an aggravated assault on a law enforcement officer.
2011-05-13	Manuel Bueno (34)	Hispanic/Latino	Florida (North Miami Beach)	Shot after brandishing a knife.
2011-05-11	Jeff Wilson (30)	Black	Illinois (Chicago)	Shot during armed robbery of store and after shooting at police.
2011-05-10	Michael Palomino Jr. (28)	White	Glendale, Arizona	
2011-05-10	Dale Garrett (51)	Black	California (Los Angeles)	Shot twice in the back by Los Angeles Police Department Detective Arthur Gamboa. Det. Gamboa claimed that Garrett pulled a knife and threatened to kill him during an attempted drug bust. The Los Angeles Police Commission ruled that the shooting violated the LAPD's policy on lethal force.
2011-05-10	Allen Kephart (43)	White	California (Lake Arrowhead)	After allegedly running a stop sign, Allen Kephart was beaten and tasered two dozen times by three San Bernardino County Sheriff Deputies in a parking lot in the unincorporated area of the San Bernardino Mountains near Lake Arrowhead.
2011-05-09	Adrian Perez (26)	Hispanic/Latino	California (Bakersfield)	Bakersfield police officers, responding to a residence for a report of trespassing found Adrian Perez. During the encounter Perez drew a handgun from his pocket and fired on the officers. Three officers returned fire, killing Perez.
2011-05-08	Jay Allen Johnson (52)	Race unspecified	Alaska (Anchorage)	
2011-05-08	Henry Lee Jones Jr. (20)	Black	Arkansas (North Little Rock)	
2011-05-07	Brian Edward Scaman (48)	White	Washington (State) (Auburn)	
2011-05-07	James D. Breton (50)	White	Manchester, New Hampshire	
2011-05-06	Jeremy Michael Lundquist (32)	White	Phoenix, Arizona	
2011-05-06	Jimmy James (62)	Race unspecified	Ohio (Canton)	
2011-05-06	Ed Jermolowicz (69)	Race unspecified	Illinois (Beecher)	
2011-05-06	Daniel McDonnell (40)	White	New York (West Babylon)	
2011-05-05	Jose Guerena (26)	Hispanic/Latino	Arizona (Tucson)	Marine and Iraq war veteran shot by SWAT team conducting forced-entry search of home involving a marijuana smuggling investigation. No drugs nor anything illegal was found and widow and children received $3.4 million settlement from agencies involved in raid.
2011-05-04	Robert Alonzo Raucci (58)	White	Washington (Kent)	Shot while pulling a long gun out of a taxi cab at a transit center. Police were responding to a report from the cab driver that his passenger had a shotgun or rifle across his knees.
2011-05-04	Jeffrey A. Wolfe (56)	White	Pennsylvania (Schuylkill Haven)	
2011-05-03	Antonio Tyler (18)	Black	Georgia (Marietta)	Shot after refusing to drop weapon. Police had confronted Tyler regarding the two people Tyler and two other men had forced into their home at gunpoint.
2011-05-02	Bernard Bailey (54)	Black	South Carolina (Eutawville)	A police chief for the town of Eutawville shot and killed Bernard Bailey who came to Town Hall to complain about his daughter's traffic ticket. Police chief Richard Combs tried to arrest Bailey for a charge of obstruction of justice, and Bailey walked towards his truck and they both briefly fought each other. Combs then shot Bailey twice in the chest in Bailey's truck. On December 4, 2014, prosecutors charged Combs with murder.
2011-05-01	Cesar Tomas Quiroz-Leon (27)	Hispanic/Latino	Buckeye, Arizona	
2011-05-01	Roderick Dewayne Thomas (23)	Black	Mississippi (Durant)	
2011-05-01	Marcus G. Brown (26)	Black	Connecticut (Waterbury)	

== See also ==
- Death in custody § United States
- Henry A. Wallace Police Crime Public Database
- List of cases of police brutality
- List of countries with annual rates and counts for killings by law enforcement officers
- List of law enforcement officers killed in the line of duty in the United States
- List of law enforcement officers convicted for an on-duty killing in the United States
- List of shootings by US immigration agents
- List of police reforms related to the George Floyd protests
- List of unarmed African Americans killed by law enforcement officers in the United States
- Lists of killings by law enforcement officers
- Police brutality in the United States
- Police misconduct § United States
- Police riot § United States
- Police use of deadly force in the United States
