= Cimarron Municipal Airport =

Airport in Kansas, United States

Coordinates: 37°49′50″N 100°21′01″W

- IATA: none; ICAO: none; FAA LID: 8K8

Summary
- Airport type: Public
- Owner: City of Cimarron
- Serves: Cimarron, Kansas
- Elevation AMSL: 2,752 ft (839 m)
- Interactive map of Cimarron Municipal Airport

Runways
Direction	Length		Surface
Direction	ft	m	Surface
01/19	2,800	853	Asphalt
11/29	2,450	747	Turf

Statistics (2006)
- Aircraft operations: 3,500
- Based aircraft: 10
- Source: Federal Aviation Administration

Cimarron Municipal Airport (FAA LID: 8K8) is in Gray County, Kansas, United States, two miles north of Cimarron, which owns it.

== Facilities ==
The airport covers 80 acres (32 ha) and has two runways: 01/19 is 2,800 x 32 ft (853 x 10 m) asphalt and 11/29 is 2,450 x 50 ft (747 x 15 m) turf.

In the year ending June 13, 2006 the airport had 3,500 general aviation aircraft operations, average 10 per day. Ten aircraft were then based at the airport, all single-engine.

== See also ==
- List of airports in Kansas
