= Clarence Dupnik =

American law enforcement official

Sheriff of Pima County, Arizona
- In office 1980–2015
- Preceded by: Richard J. Boykin
- Succeeded by: Chris Nanos

Personal details
- Born: January 11, 1936 (age 90) Helena, Texas, U.S.
- Party: Democratic

Clarence William Dupnik (born January 11, 1936) is an American retired law enforcement official. Dupnik was appointed Sheriff of Pima County, Arizona, in February 1980 to fill a vacancy rising from the resignation of his predecessor, Richard Boykin.

He won election in his own right in September 1980, and was re-elected every four years until he retired in 2015. Dupnik is a member of the Democratic party.

== Life and career ==
Dupnik was born in Helena, Texas, and grew up in Bisbee, Arizona. He attended the University of Arizona in Tucson. He graduated from polygraph training school Keeler Institute in Chicago, the Southern Police Institute at the University of Louisville, and the Urban Affairs Executive Institute at Massachusetts Institute of Technology.

He joined the Tucson Police Department in 1958, as a Patrol Officer, eventually rising to Major in charge of Field Operations. In 1977 he was appointed Chief Deputy with the Pima County Sheriff's Department, and in 1980 he was appointed Sheriff. He was elected seven times to four-year terms as Sheriff.

Because Pima County shares a border with Mexico, Dupnik's office handles a wide range of illegal immigration and drug trafficking matters. He won the contest to name the Tucson Toros baseball team.

On June 22, 2011, Dupnik announced he would be dedicating about 20 officers to a task force to jail people for letting off fireworks on the 4th of July, to protect against sparking new wildfires.

=== Political views ===
Dupnik was a vocal opponent of Arizona's anti-illegal immigrant bill SB 1070. In April 2010, Dupnik criticized the law, calling it "racist", "disgusting", and "stupid".

In September 2010, Dupnik criticized the Tea Party movement at an immigration forum, publicly claiming the movement was associated with bigotry.

=== Killing of Jose Guerena ===
Dupnik received worldwide criticism over his defense of the botched SWAT team raid of Jose Guerena that left the former Marine dead. Dupnik openly stated that the raid was justified and told Arizona Daily Star columnist Josh Brodesky that he may never release the search warrants and police affidavits. Dupnik defended the police who left Guerena, after being shot 60 times in 7 seconds, inside his house while paramedics were prevented from entering for over an hour.

=== 2011 Tucson shooting ===
Dupnik's office was responsible for security and later oversaw local response and investigation of the 2011 Tucson shooting. Dupnik stated that he felt that the level of vitriol in political discourse created an atmosphere where violence was likely. "It's not unusual for all public officials to get threats constantly, myself included. That's the sad thing about what's going on in America: pretty soon we're not going to be able to find reasonable, decent people willing to subject themselves to serve in public office."

Conservatives criticized Dupnik's comments as misplaced and uninformed. In an interview with Megyn Kelly, Dupnik stated that he had not seen evidence linking the shooting to discussions in the media, but believed the issue had to be raised.
