= Old Gray County Courthouse =

- U.S. National Register of Historic Places
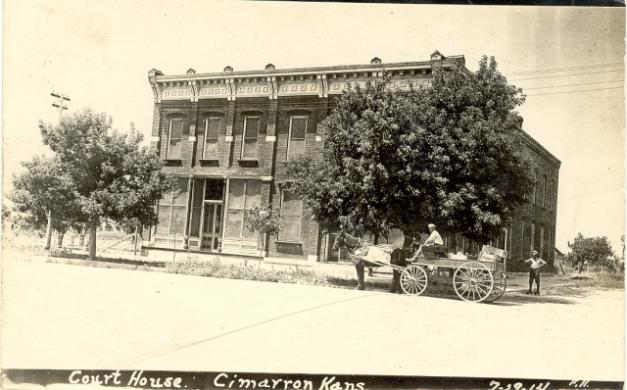
- The Old Gray County Courthouse in 1914.

- Location within Kansas Location within the United States
- Location: 117 S. Main Street, Cimarron, Kansas
- Coordinates: 37°48′23″N 100°20′54″W
- Area: less than one acre
- Built: 1880
- Architectural style: Italianate
- NRHP reference No.: 09000873
- Added to NRHP: November 4, 2009

The Old Gray County Courthouse is a brick building at 117 South Main Street, Cimarron, Kansas. It was built as a department store in 1880 and leased to Gray County for use as a courthouse in January 1888.

It was a location of the Battle of Cimarron in 1889.

== See also ==
- National Register of Historic Places listings in Kansas
- Old Logan County Courthouse (Russell Springs, Kansas)
