= Pima County Sheriff's Department =

Law enforcement agency in Arizona

Pima County Sheriff's Department (PCSD)
- Badge of the Pima County Sheriff Department
- Abbreviation: PCSD
- Motto: Keeping the Peace Since 1865 – Service with Honor Since 1865

Agency overview
- Formed: 1865
- Employees: 600 sworn deputies, 872 civilian
- Annual budget: $135,000,000

Jurisdictional structure
- Operations jurisdiction: Pima, Arizona, United States
- Area: 9,189 square miles
- Population: 380,000 unincorporated, 1,000,000+ County wide
- Legal jurisdiction: Pima County
- General nature: Local civilian police

Operational structure
- Headquarters: 1750 East Benson Highway, Tucson, Arizona
- Corrections personnel and Civilian employees: Sheriff's Auxiliary Volunteers (SAV)
- Agency executive: Chris Nanos, Sheriff

Facilities
- Substations: 6
- Airbases: 1
- Pima County Jails: 1
- Chevrolet Tahoe, Ford Crown Victoria, Ford Explorers: 400 estimate
- Airplanes: 3
- Helicopters: 1

Website
- Pima County Sheriff's Department

The Pima County Sheriff's Department (PCSD) is an American law enforcement agency that serves the unincorporated areas of Pima County, Arizona. It serves the seventh largest county in the nation. It operates six district offices and three smaller satellite offices. The Corrections Bureau has four facilities which houses on average 1,850 inmates per day.

The department employs about 516 sworn officers and more than 872 civilian employees and corrections personnel and utilizes the services of over 400 volunteers. Its headquarters is on East Benson Highway in Tucson, Arizona.

== Crime statistics ==
According to Federal Bureau of Investigation data in a media release by SCSD in 2012, Tucson has 631.94 violent crimes per 100,000 population, while Phoenix has 518.12 violent crimes per 100,000 population. The Tucson metropolitan area has the second lowest crime rate in the state of Arizona. The Pima County Sheriff's Department averages 4.3 minutes to respond to emergencies 90% of the time and the average response time to all emergencies is 5.3 minutes.

== Sheriffs ==
Sheriffs of Pima County
Sheriff	Term	Political party
(Berry) Hill deArmitt	1864–1865	
Francis Marion Hodges	1865–1866	
Peter Rainsford Brady	1867–1869	
(Charles) Hylor Ott	1869–1872	
William Sanders Oury	1873–1876	
Charles Alexander Shibell	1877–1880	
Robert H. Paul	1881–1886	
Eugene O. Shaw	1885–1887	
Matthew F. Shaw Sr.	1887–1890	
James K. Brown	1891–1892	
Joseph B. Scott	1893–1894	
Robert Nelson Leatherwood	1895–1898	Democratic
Lyman Willis Wakefield	1899–1900	
Frank E. Murphy	1901–1904	
Nabor Pacheco	1905–1908	
John Nelson	1909–1914	
Albert W. Forbes	1915–1916	
J. T. "Rye" Miles	1917–1920	
Benjamin Franklin Daniels	1921–1922	
Walter W. Baily	1923–1926	
James William McDonald	1927–1930	
Walter W. Baily	1931–1932	
John F. Belton	1933–1936	
Edward F. Echols	1937–1946	
Jerome P. Martin	1947–1950	
Frank A. Eyman	1951–1955	
Benjamin Julius McKinney	1955–1956	
James W. Clark	1957–1958	
Waldon Vivian Burr	1959–1971	
William Coy Cox	1971–1976	
Richard J. Boykin	1977–1980	
Clarence W. Dupnik	1980–2015	
Christopher Nanos	2015–2017	
Mark D. Napier	2017–2021	
Christopher Nanos	since 2021	

Past sheriffs include Arizona pioneers such as Peter Rainsford Brady, Charles Alexander Shibell, Robert H. Paul, Robert Nelson Leatherwood, and Benjamin Franklin Daniels.

=== Edward F. Echols (1936–1946) ===
One of the most interesting of Pima County's sheriffs was Ed Echols. According to historian David Leighton, of the Arizona Daily Star newspaper, Ed Echols was born in Stockdale, Texas, in 1879. As a teenager he helped his father on cattle drives up the old Chisholm Trail. In 1902, along with his brother Art he traveled by wagon to Cochise County, Arizona, where he worked selling cords of wood and also as a ranch hand. Five years later he went on tour with the Miller Brothers 101 Wild West Show, touring cities like New York and Chicago. On the tour, he also befriended future film actor Tom Mix whom he would remain friends with for years to come.

In 1912, Echols traveled to Calgary, Alberta, Canada for the first Frontier Days and Cowboy Championship Contest (later the Calgary Stampede). He competed against the best ropers in the world and garnered the title of World's Champion Roper.

In 1921, he homesteaded land near Mescal, Arizona southeast of Tucson. It is believed this land became part of the larger Double X Ranch that he came to own. Three years later, Leighton Kramer, an Easterner who wintered in Tucson, Arizona conceived the idea of a rodeo and rodeo parade in Tucson and turned to Echols for advice on creation of the La Fiesta de Los Vaqueros. For his many years of involvement in the Tucson rodeo he would gain the nickname "Mr. Rodeo."

In 1934, Echols ran for sheriff of Pima County, even having his friend and movie star Will Rogers campaign for him, but still lost the election. Two years later he ran again and won.

From 1936 to 1946 Echols served as sheriff of Pima County. He chose Herb Wood as his undersheriff and when he first entered office he had only six deputies for the whole county. He brought the county jail up to standard and improved the office filing system. For the year 1939, he reported his men had recovered $30,408 of stolen property, transported 54 prisoners to the state prison in Florence, Arizona, and served 915 subpoenas.

By 1944, his staff had increased to 24 with 12 deputies in Tucson, 4 in Ajo, 1 in Marana, 1 in Arivaca, 3 jailers, 1 matron and 2 cooks. In 1946 he ran unsuccessfully for sheriff but later served many years as a constable, retiring in 1962. He died in 1969.

=== Clarence Dupnik (1980–2015) ===
Clarence Dupnik was the sheriff for over 35 years. A veteran of over 50 years in local law enforcement, he served as sheriff of Pima County from February 1980 till he retired in 2015; he was elected seven times. Dupnik saw the population of Pima County increase from 191,216 to about 1.5 million people. Dupnik's accomplishments are:

- Oversaw the 1984 construction and implementation of one of the first direct-supervision correctional facilities in the nation. Direct-supervision facilities allow correctional staff to interact directly with inmates within housing units. This philosophy has resulted in reduced violence against staff and other inmates within the facility.
- Created the vision and helped implement the plan to transition drug enforcement efforts into the Pima County/Tucson Metropolitan Counter Narcotics Alliance which involves several local, state, and federal law enforcement agencies.
- Instituted mandatory drug testing for all Sheriff's Department applicants and a random drug testing program for all employees. With advancing technology, the mandatory drug testing program was expanded by adding hair testing for drugs. The Sheriff's Department was one of the first law enforcement agencies in the country to utilize hair testing as part of a drug testing program.
- Served as a founding member of the Command Group of the Arizona Alliance Planning Committee – a joint effort between federal, state, and local law enforcement agencies, in cooperation with the military, designed to reduce the influx of narcotics across the Southern Arizona border.
- Organized a national and international award-winning crime-prevention program, using Arizona's first trained law-enforcement volunteers, later numbering more than 200 men and women operating in the Tucson, Green Valley, and Ajo communities. Volunteers provide public fingerprinting, crime scene security, traffic control, Neighborhood Watch administration, and preventive patrols in neighborhoods and county parks.
- Oversaw the creation of the Pima Regional SWAT team. This became the largest, most capable tactical team in the state of Arizona and the only Federal Emergency Management Agency type 1 tactical team in the southern region of the United States. The Pima Regional SWAT team is a collaborative effort by officers from seven Pima County law enforcement agencies and medics from local emergency medical support agencies. The program includes several distinct elements: Tactical, Negotiations, EOD, Canine, and Tactical Emergency Medical Support (TEMS). These elements work together to resolve dangerous incidents that pose a risk to the lives of the residents of Pima County.
- Implemented a Regional Explosives Ordnance Detail (EOD) consisting of several local agencies and resulting in the only EOD team in the nation to which ATF and FBI agents are formally assigned. This Regional EOD team is equivalent to three FEMA Type 1 teams and is the only one in the nation that includes an integrated investigative element.
- Created the Pima County Regional Law Enforcement Memorial Service to honor all regional law enforcement officers who have died in the line of duty. The Regional Memorial Service recognizes and memorializes 47 federal, tribal, state, county and local law enforcement officers who have died in the line of duty while serving in Pima County. This annual event brings together over thirty area law enforcement agencies to honor the community's fallen officers at one event.
- Started the first Border Crime Unit that offers a mechanism for federal, state and local law enforcement to cooperatively address the rising violence from the illegal human and drug trafficking trades. The Border Crime Unit has grown from an initial assignment of a sergeant and five deputies to a multi-agency task force composed of two sergeants and eighteen deputies from the Pima County Sheriff's Department, United States Border Patrol agents, and officers from the Department of Public Safety. The Border Crime Unit has become a national model for Border Crime task forces.
- Presided over the implementation of an interoperable regional public safety communications system of unprecedented proportion that was made possible by voter approval of a $92 million bond.
- The first law local enforcement agency to be provided equipment that allows all patrol vehicles to change intersection signal lights to "green" as they approach during an emergency response or pursuit. This equipment has resulted in improved response times and increased safety for patrol deputies and the motoring public.
- Implemented a Dial Dictation System (DDS) that allows deputies to quickly dictate reports over the phone. This system minimizes the time a deputy is not available to provide emergency response and patrol the local neighborhoods, thus resulting in faster response times. The DDS Unit is staffed by civilian personnel who transcribe the recorded reports, thereby freeing deputies to respond to calls for service.
- One of the first agencies in the country to deploy a Taser less lethal device to every commissioned officer, as well as to many Corrections Officers within the Pima County Adult Detention Center.
- In 2006, reinstituted the Pima County Sheriff's Department's (PCSD) Basic Law Enforcement Training Academy to train commissioned law enforcement personnel. In conjunction with the regionalization concept of tactical elements from adjoining agencies, and due to numerous requests from local law enforcement agencies, the PCSD academy became a regional law enforcement academy in 2008. The first graduating class included deputies with the department, as well as officers from the Marana Police Department, Oro Valley Police Department and the Sahuarita Police Department. The Sheriff's Department also partnered with the United States Air Force in 2011 by inviting military police to attend the regional academy to be certified as peace officers in the State of Arizona.
- Implemented Advanced Crisis Intervention Training (C.I.T.) as a 40-hour course offered to commissioned, corrections and civilian personnel. By 2011, 32% of deputies were C.I.T. trained, a percentage that exceeds the national standard by more than 10%. C.I.T. trained personnel are better able to identify, manage and help individuals suffering a mental crisis while reducing the potential for violent escalation.
- Provided each deputy with a smart phone that enables them to access criminal investigation data bases, Department manuals, policies, procedures, reference materials, and immediate notifications of updates to those materials. Deputies are also able to instantly transmit photos of lost children or other individuals, including photos of suspects. The phone also serves as a back-up communication device to the dispatch center.
- Enabled the issuance of AR-15 type patrol rifles to deputies, giving them a long gun platform for both urban and rural applications. The issued weapon is the Rock River Arms Tactical Car A4 equipped with an Aimpoint Red Dot sighting system for improved accuracy and faster target acquisition. Pima County is one of the first agencies in the country to utilize a carbine rifle as standard issue and still issues a Remington 870 shotgun to all qualified deputies.
- Provided each patrol officer with the latest in Mobile Data Computers (MDC) allowing patrol sergeants and deputies to monitor call activity, see the location of other patrol units through GPS mapping, provide immediate access to the Sheriff's Department's Records Management System and local and state Criminal Justice Databases. MDC's allow personnel to access and view reports and mugshot photos while in the field.
- Provided each detective, bomb technician, traffic investigator and Patrol Commander with the latest in Netbook computers. These Netbook computers provide wireless internet access to the Sheriff's Department's Records Management System and local and state Criminal Justice Databases allowing investigative personnel to view reports, photos and conduct crime analysis while in the field.
- Created and implemented one of the first and most comprehensive first responder field trauma programs in law enforcement by providing all deputies with a law enforcement version of the latest U.S. Military battlefield trauma kit. The Individual First Aid Kits (IFAK) were issued in June 2010 along with classroom and hands on training. The IFAK is designed to treat gunshot and other penetrating injuries. It has been put to use on numerous occasions by deputies treating victims of violent crimes, especially during the response to the January 8, 2011, shooting involving Congresswoman Gabby Giffords. The use of these kits and their contents is credited for saving numerous lives that day.
- Enabled the Pima County Sheriff's Department to become what is believed to be the first agency in the United States to utilize fixed wing Helio-Courier aircraft for tactical patrol support. These aircraft have been outfitted with some of the most advanced technology available and have led to significant increases in criminal apprehensions and enormous cost savings over more traditional aircraft operations. Also implemented a helicopter program for border crime and search and rescue operations, thereby reducing response time and providing for increased safety for law enforcement and the citizens of Pima County.

=== Chris Nanos (2015–2017, since 2021) ===
Deputy Sheriff Chris Nanos took over as Sheriff on August 1, 2015. Nanos has been with the department since 1984. He has worked in all fields of the Sheriff's Department. Nanos has faced multiple controversies relating to his time at the El Paso Police Department, where he resigned in 1982. He faced accusations of excessive force, off duty gambling, improper use of his siren, and tardiness. He is also accused of kicking a suspect in the head hard enough the suspect required hospitalization.

== Line of duty deaths ==
Officer	End of Watch	Details
Dep. Timothy Graham	Wednesday, August 10, 2005	Struck by vehicle
Corr.Sgt. Shannon Russell	Thursday, December 5, 2002	Heart attack
Dep. Randall Graves	Thursday, January 23, 1986	Motorcycle accident
Dep. Ernest Cavillo	Thursday, July 21, 1983	Gunfire
Dep. Jack Brierly	Monday, November 16, 1953	Automobile accident
Dep. John Anderson	Monday, August 9, 1948	Fall
Dep. Clifford Nelson	Tuesday, October 23, 1928	Aircraft accident
Ranger James Mercer	Friday, December 11, 1914	Gunfire
Dep. Joe Meeks	Tuesday, January 21, 1913	Gunfire
Dep. Andrew Holbrook	Sunday, April 29, 1883	Gunfire
Dep. Milton McDowell	Thursday, January 1, 1880	Gunfire

== See also ==
- Jose Guerena shooting by PCSD
- List of law enforcement agencies in Arizona
- Arizona's First Sheriff: Berry Hill De Armitt by Ronald E. Benson in The Smoke Signal, (No. 115), published by the Tucson Corral of the Westerners, December 2023.
