= Savannah Guthrie =

American journalist (born 1971)

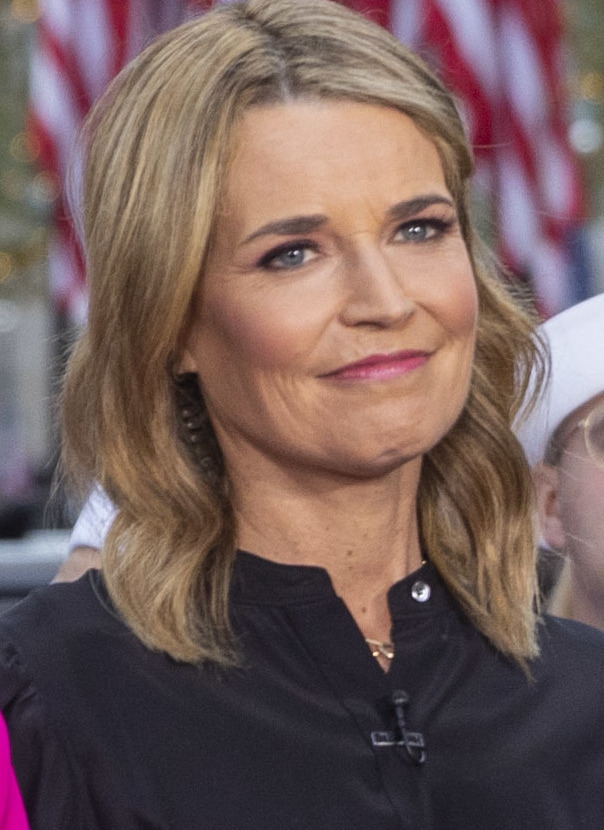
- Guthrie in 2022
- Born: Savannah Clark Guthrie; December 27, 1971 (age 54); Melbourne, Victoria, Australia
- Citizenship: United States • Australia
- Education: University of Arizona (BA); Georgetown University (JD)
- Occupations: Broadcast journalist; author; producer
- Years active: 1993–present
- Employer: NBC News
- Known for: White House Correspondent (2008–2011); The Daily Rundown co-anchor (2010–2011); NBC Chief Legal Correspondent (2011–present); Today co-anchor (2012–present); Macy's Thanksgiving Day Parade co-host (2012–present)
- Spouses: Mark Orchard (m. 2005; div. 2009); Michael Feldman (m. 2014)
- Children: 2
- Parents: Charles Guthrie (father); Nancy Guthrie (mother)

Savannah Clark Guthrie (born December 27, 1971) is an American and Australian broadcast journalist and attorney. She is a main co-anchor of the NBC News morning show Today, a position she has held since July 2012.

Guthrie joined NBC News in September 2007 as a legal analyst and correspondent, regularly reporting on trials throughout the United States. After serving as a White House correspondent between 2008 and 2011 and as co-anchor of the MSNBC program The Daily Rundown in 2010 and 2011, Guthrie was announced as the co-host of Today's third hour alongside Natalie Morales and Al Roker. In that role, she substituted as news anchor and main co-host and appeared as the chief legal analyst across all NBC platforms. Guthrie ceased hosting the third-hour and acting as chief legal analyst in 2012 when she replaced Ann Curry as co-anchor of Today.

Gurthrie's mother, Nancy, disappeared on February 1, 2026, drawing national attention. Guthrie subsequently suspended her broadcasting duties for the NBC network, including co-hosting the 2026 Winter Olympics in Italy; she returned to NBC News on April 6, 2026.

== Early life and education ==
Savannah Clark Guthrie was born on December 27, 1971, to American parents in Melbourne, Australia, and was named after her great‑grandmother. Her father, Charles, a mining engineer, was stationed there for work, and the family lived in the Melbourne suburb of Beaumaris at the time of her birth. They returned to the United States two years later and settled in Tucson, Arizona. Savannah Guthrie did not return to Australia until 2015, while working for Today, describing the visit as a "lifelong dream". While in Australia, Guthrie and her mother, Nancy, visited Sydney as well as the Melbourne hospital where she was born and the house in Beaumaris where the family had lived.

After graduating from Amphitheater High School in Tucson, Guthrie received a B.A. in journalism from the University of Arizona, graduating cum laude in 1993. She was a member of the Arizona Alpha chapter of Pi Beta Phi. She received a juris doctor (J.D.) from Georgetown University Law Center, where she graduated magna cum laude in 2002. She received the highest score on the Arizona Bar exam in the year she took it, according to Washingtonian magazine.

== Career ==
Guthrie's first job in broadcasting was at KTVM, the NBC affiliate in Butte, Montana; she started in October 1993, but on her 10th day at the station, the local news operation was closed. She then went to work at ABC affiliate KMIZ in Columbia, Missouri, where she worked for two years before returning to Tucson and a job with NBC affiliate KVOA in 1995. After five years in Arizona, she took a job at WRC-TV, NBC's owned-and-operated station in Washington, D.C., where she covered major stories, including the September 11 attack on the Pentagon and the 2001 anthrax attacks.

After several years as a broadcast journalist, Guthrie chose to resume her higher education. In 2002, she graduated magna cum laude with a Juris Doctor from Georgetown University Law Center. She is a member of the bars of the District of Columbia and Arizona, having scored first place on the Arizona Bar Exam. She became a member of Order of the Coif and received the International Academy of Trial Lawyers' Student Advocacy award for her work with victims of domestic violence.

Guthrie worked for the law firm Akin Gump Strauss Hauer & Feld, where she served as a litigation associate, specializing in white-collar criminal defense. Guthrie accepted a clerkship on the U.S. District Court for the District of Columbia, but she later turned the role down to pursue her career in journalism. In 2004, she became a national trial correspondent for CourtTV. Guthrie covered high-profile legal proceedings, including the Senate Judiciary Committee confirmation hearings of U.S. Supreme Court nominee Samuel Alito, the abduction and murder trial of Carlie Brucia, the Martha Stewart case, and the Michael Jackson trial.

=== NBC News (2007–present) ===
Guthrie became a correspondent for NBC News in September 2007. She covered Sarah Palin's 2008 vice-presidential race from Fairbanks, Pittsburgh, San Antonio, Sioux City, Iowa, and Washington, D.C. On December 18, she was named a White House correspondent for NBC News. In this capacity, she contributed to all NBC News properties. Guthrie was also an NBC News anchor and substitute anchor on NBC Nightly News.

==== The Today Show (2011–present) ====
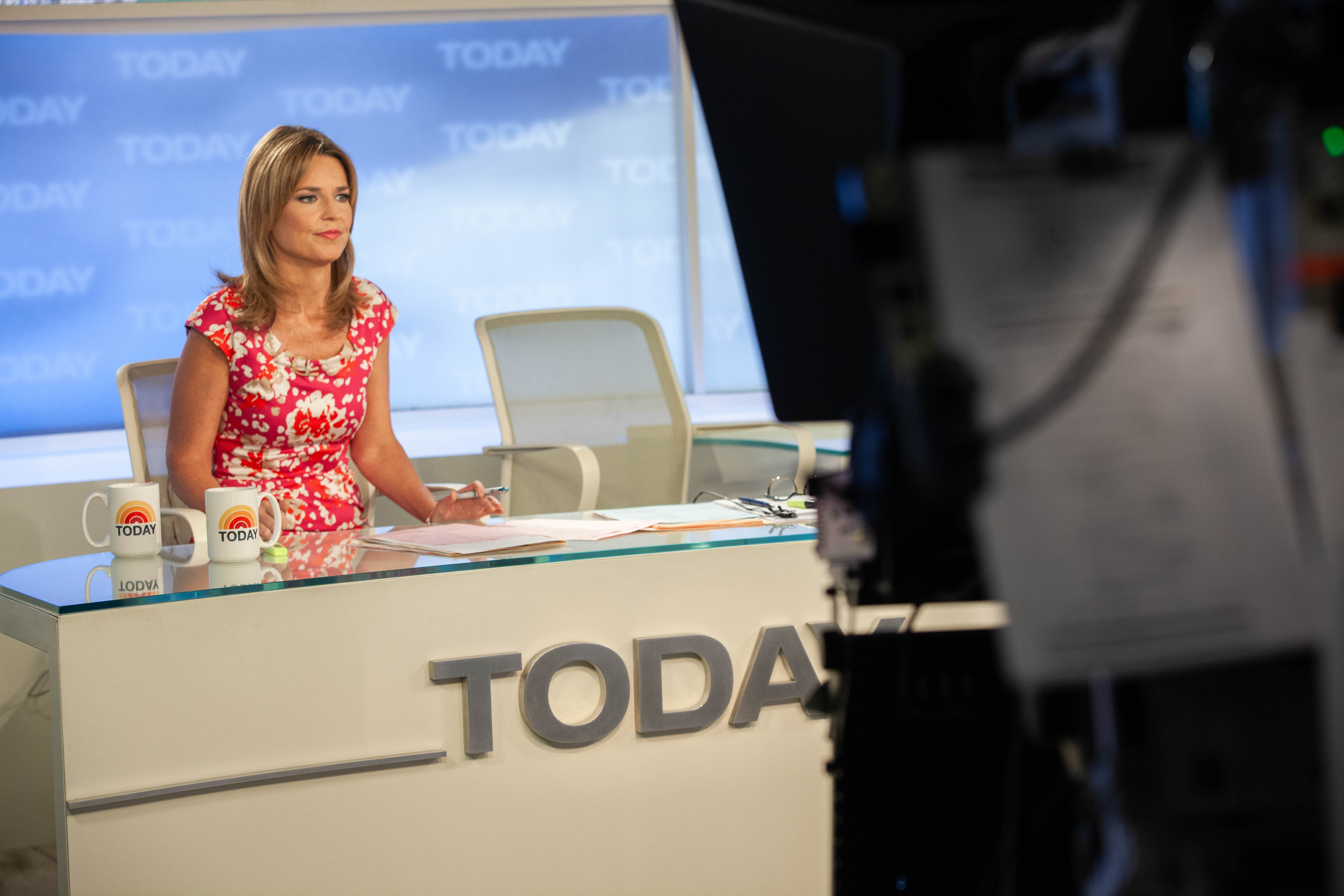
Guthrie during a live broadcast of NBC's Today show, in 2012

After Guthrie substituted for both Meredith Vieira and Ann Curry on Today, it was confirmed on May 9, 2011, that she would become co-host of the 9 a.m. hour alongside Natalie Morales and Al Roker, and the show's Chief Legal Editor. The move came after Vieira announced her departure from the show as co-host of the main program, and the subsequent promotions of Curry and Morales to main co-host and news anchor, respectively. Guthrie departed The Daily Rundown for Today on June 9, 2011, at which time she was appointed NBC News chief legal analyst, making her first appearance in this role on May 25, 2011. On June 29, 2012, it was announced that Guthrie would co-anchor Today, replacing Curry. Her first day as co-anchor alongside Matt Lauer was on July 9, 2012.

In 2011, Guthrie conducted an interview with Donald Trump in which he discussed his role in the Barack Obama "birther" controversy. Later that year, she interviewed Conrad Murray after he was found guilty of involuntary manslaughter in the death of Michael Jackson. She reported exclusive details on the death of Osama bin Laden.

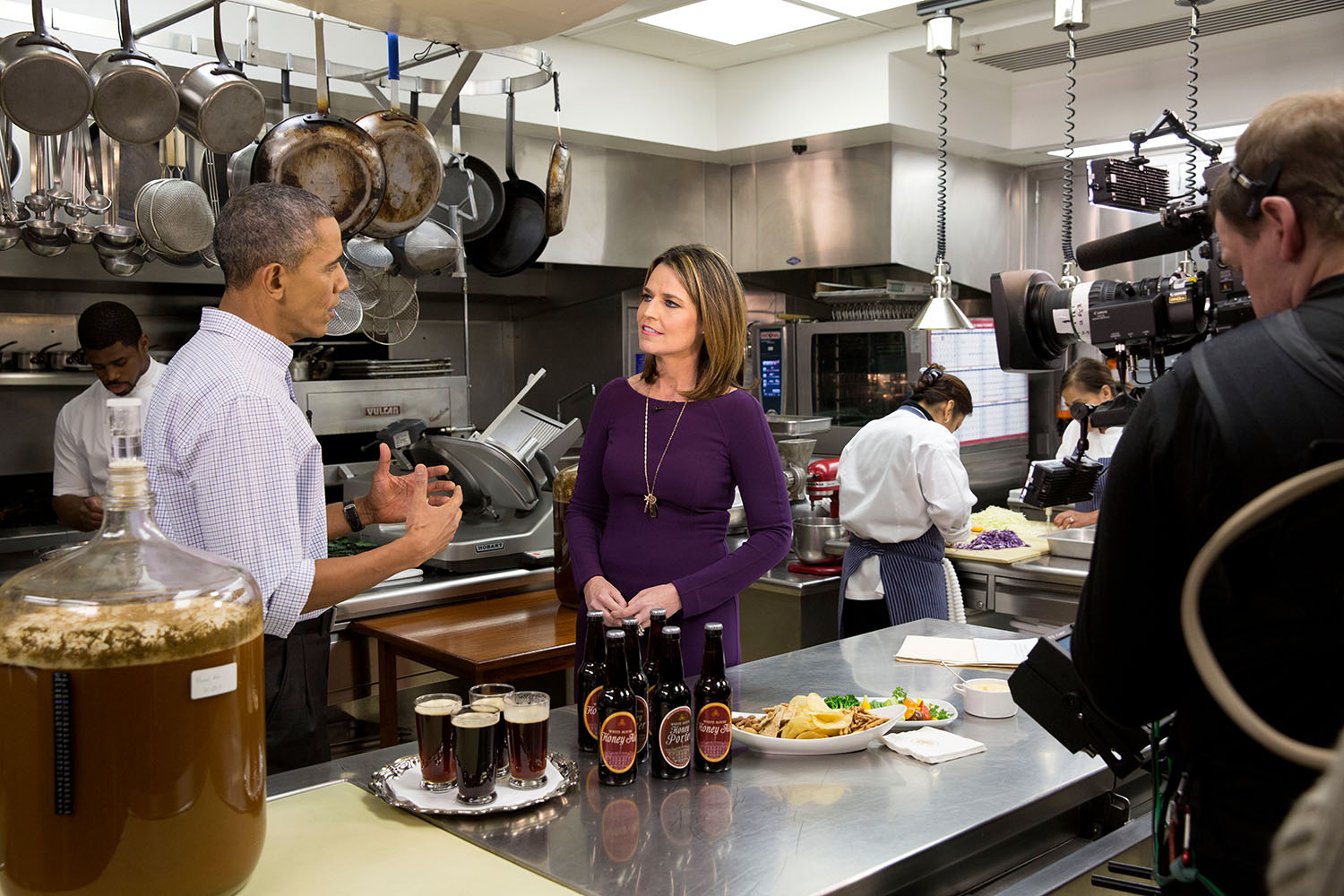
Guthrie interviews Barack Obama in the White House kitchen for a Super Bowl XLIX pre-game show, in 2015

Since 2012, Guthrie has hosted the Macy's Thanksgiving Day Parade on NBC and the annual Rockefeller Center Christmas tree lighting. On November 29, 2017, Guthrie welcomed Hoda Kotb as cohost after Lauer's sexual harassment of colleagues became public. Guthrie was included in Time magazine's list of 100 most influential people of 2018.

In October 2020, she conducted another interview with then-President Trump during his re-election campaign amidst the COVID-19 pandemic in the United States. Guthrie pressed him on several topics, including his debts, response to the pandemic, and refusal to condemn the QAnon conspiracy theory.

=== Other work ===
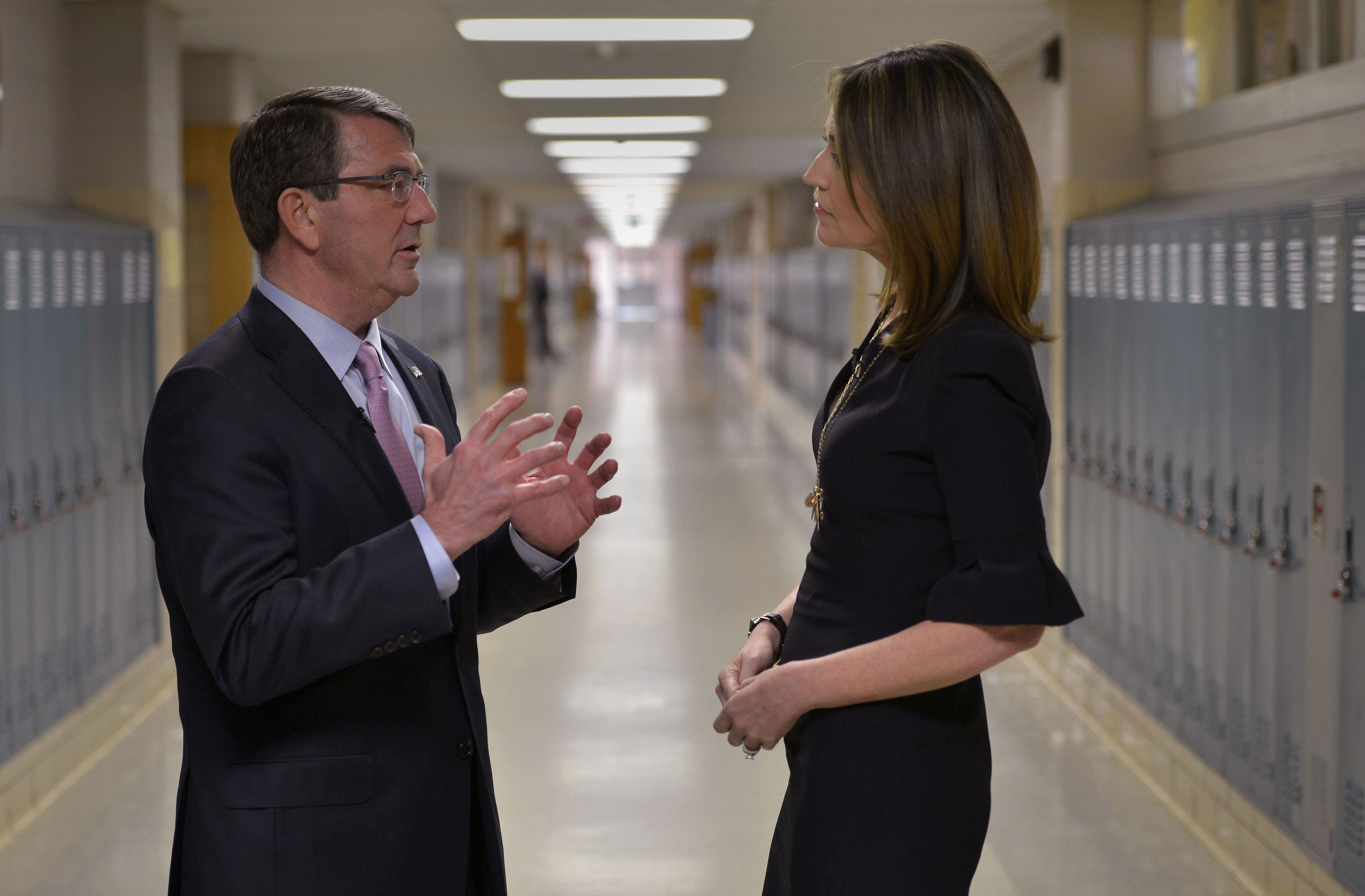
Guthrie interviews U.S. Secretary of Defense Ash Carter, in 2015

Guthrie was a commentator in the first four episodes of season one of truTV Presents: World's Dumbest.... Guthrie appeared as herself in the 2013 series finale of the NBC sitcom 30 Rock and the 2015 film Sharknado 3: Oh Hell No!. In 2018, Guthrie participated in Match for Africa, an exhibition tennis match charity event. She played with American professional tennis player Jack Sock against Bill Gates and Swiss professional tennis player Roger Federer. Guthrie and Sock lost. The final score was 3–6.

Guthrie is the author of two children's books: Princesses Wear Pants and Princesses Save the World, and one religious book, Mostly What God Does: Reflections on Seeking and Finding His Love Everywhere. In February 2021, she was announced to be an interim guest host of Jeopardy! following the death of host Alex Trebek. Her episodes aired June 14–25, 2021. Guthrie and Hoda Kotb appeared on an episode of Curb Your Enthusiasm.

On May 11, 2026, it was announced that Guthrie would serve as host of a new NBC game show, Wordle, which will be produced by Tonight Show host Jimmy Fallon as well as The New York Times, who owns the word puzzle. The show is slated to premiere in 2027.

== Personal life ==
=== Marriages and family ===
In December 2005, Guthrie married English-born BBC News presenter Mark Orchard, whom she met while covering the trial of Michael Jackson. The pair divorced in January 2009. Later that year, she began a relationship with Democratic political and communications consultant Michael Feldman while vacationing in the Turks and Caicos Islands. The couple became engaged in 2013 and were married on March 15, 2014, in Tucson, Arizona. Two days later, Guthrie announced she was four months pregnant. Guthrie gave birth to their first child, a daughter they named Vale, in August 2014. On June 7, 2016, Guthrie announced she and her husband were again expecting. In late 2016, she gave birth to their second child, a son they named Charles, after her father, who died unexpectedly in 1988 on a mining exploration in Mexico. According to Guthrie, their son was conceived through in-vitro fertilization.

=== Health ===
In January 2026, Guthrie had surgery on her vocal cords to remove nodules and a polyp, and took a brief hiatus from the Today show to recover. She returned to the program later that month.

=== Disappearance of mother ===
On February 1, 2026, the Pima County Sheriff's Department reported that Guthrie's mother, Nancy Guthrie, was missing. She was last seen on January 31, 2026, and authorities treated her disappearance as a crime. Guthrie stepped away from her NBC duties, including co-hosting the 2026 Winter Olympics opening ceremonies, to assist in the search.

On March 27, 2026, Guthrie announced that she would return to Today on April 6, following a two-month hiatus.

In June 2026, news organizations reported that a second note connected to the case claimed Nancy Guthrie had died shortly after her abduction. Authorities have not independently confirmed her death or recovered her remains.

On July 31, the Pima County Sheriff's Department publicly released redacted versions of two notes in an effort to identify their author. The first demanded a multimillion-dollar ransom, while the second stated that Nancy had died and had been buried, although investigators continue to treat her fate as unresolved.

== See also ==
- New Yorkers in journalism
