= The Rundown with José Diaz-Balart =

American political news talk show

- Genre: News
- Presented by: Chuck Todd (2010–14); Savannah Guthrie (2010–11); Jose Diaz-Balart (2014–15)
- Country of origin: United States
- Original language: English

Production
- Production locations: Washington DC (2010–14); Miami, Florida (2014–15)
- Running time: 60 minutes (2010–14); 120 minutes (2014–15)

Original release
- Network: MSNBC
- Release: January 11, 2010 – October 2, 2015

Related
- The Daily Rundown with Chuck Todd; José Díaz-Balart; MSNBC Live with Jose Diaz-Balart

The Rundown with José Diaz-Balart was an American political news talk show that aired on MSNBC. The show premiered on January 11, 2010, and was hosted by Jose Diaz-Balart. The program aired in the 9 a.m. to 11 a.m. timeslot on weekdays.

The show premiered as the hour-long The Daily Rundown on January 11, 2010, running in the 9 a.m. to 10 a.m. timeslot on weekdays, and featured news, interviews, and analysis relating to politics from the MSNBC Washington D.C. Bureau. The show is billed as showcasing the depth and experience of the NBC News Washington bureau. The show primarily focuses on the top political stories of the day.

From launch until June 2011, original host Chuck Todd was joined by then White House correspondent Savannah Guthrie. Guthrie left on June 3, 2011 in preparation for her new role as a co-host of NBC's Today. Since her departure, Todd anchored the broadcast alone. Eventually, the show become known as The Daily Rundown with Chuck Todd.

As part of NBC's plan to move Todd to anchor Meet the Press beginning September 7, 2014, Todd handed over his role as anchor for The Daily Rundown. He was replaced by José Diaz-Balart as part of a new, expanded version of the program. The show in its new two-hour format, having absorbed Diaz-Balart's eponymous hour-long show (broadcast after The Daily Rundown in the 10 a.m. to 11 a.m. timeslot on weekdays), debuted on November 17, 2014 as The Rundown with José Diaz-Balart.

As part of a wider restructuring of MSNBC's dayside programming, Diaz-Balart's programming was moved under the more generic MSNBC Live branding on October 5, 2015.

== Hosts ==
- Chuck Todd (2010–2014)
- Savannah Guthrie (2010–2011)
- José Diaz-Balart (2014–2015)

Preceded by Morning Joe	MSNBC Weekday Lineup; 9:00AM – 10:00AM	Succeeded by José Díaz-Balart
