= Mosaic Miami =

U.S. nonprofit organization

- Formation: 1935
- Type: 501(c)(3)
- Legal status: Nonprofit Organization
- Purpose: Civic engagement, interfaith dialogue, community building, education
- Headquarters: Coral Gables, Florida, United States
- Region served: Greater Miami area
- Services: Interfaith Clergy Dialogue, Camp MetroTown, Emerging Leaders, Humanitarian Dinner, Can We Talk?, Hank Meyer Headliner Award
- Executive Director: Matthew Anderson
- Website: https://www.mosaic-miami.org/
- Formerly called: Miami Coalition of Christians and Jews, MCCJ

Mosaic Miami, formerly the Miami Coalition of Christians and Jews, is a nonsectarian nonprofit organization dedicated to advancing understanding and respect among people of all cultures, religions and races. The organization strives for a community free from intolerance in which every person enjoys dignity and respect.

== History ==
The agency was founded in 1935 as a regional chapter of the National Conference of Christians and Jews (NCCJ), which later became the National Conference for Community and Justice. As part of the decentralization of NCCJ, the agency became an independent 501c3 in 2005 and—returning to its roots—changed its name to Miami Coalition of Christians and Jews.

Following the 1980 McDuffie riots, MCCJ worked with the Community Relations Board to formulate policy recommendations through a process of community hearings which resulted in the Overcoming Racial and Ethnic Isolation in Miami report.

== Activities ==
=== Community Relations and Intergroup Dialogue ===
Since its creation in 1935, the agency has worked for improving intergroup relations by creating safe havens for dialogue, training inclusive leaders, highlighting the benefits of diversity, and building bridges of understanding and respect among the different communities that call Greater Miami home.

Often characterized as a human relations organization, Mosaic Miami is also a human rights organization, advocating respect for all, working to eliminate discrimination and helping minorities gain rights, access and a greater voice. Mosaic Miami was at the forefront of the local struggle for racial justice—organizing mixed youth groups and community events in times of segregation.

Since 1935, Mosaic Miami organizes monthly Clergy Dialogues on theological and social issues among faith leaders of all denominations, thus hosting the oldest interfaith dialogue forum in the United States.

=== Law Enforcement Partnerships ===
Mosaic Miami also worked with the Miami Dade and City of Miami Police Departments, facilitating diversity training and community conversations with law enforcement professionals.

After the Elian Gonzales controversy, Mosaic Miami and the Miami Herald co-facilitated nine community dialogues with different leadership sectors.

=== Youth Development ===
In the area of youth development, Mosaic Miami's Heritage Panel is a prejudice reduction program that empowers high school students to explore cultural diversity and develop self-esteem, while fostering values that support the appreciation of differences. The program reduces bullying, taunting, cliques and harassment in the classroom while allowing students to take pride in their heritage and identity. Using a peer education methodology, Heritage Panel presentations conducted by the program graduates create a ripple effect that improves the school climate, thereby enabling more students to reach their full potential.

Mosaic Miami facilitates Camp MetroTown, an annual summer camp program hosted at Barry University in Miami Shores, Florida. Based on the Camp AnyTown program created in the 1960s by the National Conference for Community and Justice, the program focuses on creating a safe space for students to discuss community issues.

=== Community Awards ===
Annually, at its Humanitarian Awards Gala, Mosaic Miami honors community leaders who have made exceptional contributions to improving human and intergroup relations in Greater Miami.

The Hank Meyer Award for Excellence in Responsible Journalism is an award presented by Mosaic Miami to individuals who have contributed greatly to enhancing community dialogue and advancing diversity. Established in the 1970s, the award has honored many prominent journalists, such as Barbara Walters, John Quiñones, and Tom Brokaw.

== Name Change ==
In 2023 at their annual Humanitarian Awards Gala, MCCJ rebranded itself as "Mosaic Miami." The new name was intended to better reflect the organization's evolving mission of interfaith relations and community dialogue, while acknowledging the diversity of the Greater Miami community. Through a grant from the Knight Foundation, Mosaic Miami engaged Roar Media to assist with the rebranding effort, with the goal of maintaining the organization's legacy.
