= List of Arizona Rangers =

This is a list of Arizona Rangers – people who served in the Arizona Rangers between 1901 and 1909.

== Captains ==
Name	Age at enlistment	Enlistment year	Birthplace	Previous occupation
Burton C. Mossman	34	1901	Aurora, Illinois	cattleman
Thomas H. Rynning	36	1902	Christiania, Norway	soldier
Harry C. Wheeler	28	1903	Jacksonville, Florida	soldier

== Lieutenants ==
Name	Age at enlistment	Enlistment year	Birthplace	Previous occupation
William D. Allison	42	1903–1904	Ohio	police officer
John J. Brooks	36	1903–1905	Texas	ranger
John Foster	34	1906	South Carolina	police officer
William A. "Billy" Old	32	1904–1909	Texas	ranger

== Sergeants ==
Name	Age at enlistment	Enlistment year	Birthplace	Previous occupation
Clarence L. "Chapo" Beaty	28	1902–1909	Oklahoma	cattleman
John E. Campbell	36	1901–1903	Pennsylvania	farmer
Arthur F. Chase	31	1903	Illinois	clerk
Dayton L. Graham	43	1902	Ohio	police officer
Jens T. Holm	30	1902–1909	Denmark	cowboy
Arthur A. Hopkins	26	1903–1906	Colorado	soldier
Jeff Kidder	28	1903–1908	Vermillion, South Dakota	cattleman
Alex R. MacDonald	39	1903–1904	Mauritius Island	cowboy
Oscar McAda	26	1907–1909	Texas	cattleman
James E. McGee	34	1904–1906	Arkansas	carpenter
Lewis H. "Lew" Mickey	37	1905–1909	Nebraska	cattleman
J. T. "Rye" Miles	41	1907–1908	Texas	cattleman
William Sparks	42	1903–1906	Iowa	cattleman
William S. Speed	35	1906–1909	Texas	cattleman
Christopher C. "Tip" Stanford	29	1903–1909	Texas	cattleman
Frank S. Wheeler	31	1901–1909	Mississippi	cowboy

== Privates ==
Name	Age at enlistment	Enlistment year	Birthplace	Previous occupation
Roland M. "Bob" Anderson	36	1902–1908	Tennessee	cattleman
Roy Baggerly	31	1906	Texas	cattleman
James D. Bailey	33	1903–1905	Kentucky	cowboy
Fred S. Barefoot	41	1901–1903	California	cattleman
Rueben "Rube" Burnett	Unknown	1905 - 1906		
John R. Clarke	22	1906–1908	Arizona	blacksmith
Garland Coffey	29	1905	Arkansas	police officer
Wayne Davis	28	1906–1908	Arizona	cattleman
George W. DeVilbiss	31	1904	California	cattleman
Boyd M. Doak	39	1905	Texas	cattleman
Albert. E. Ehle	29	1907–1908	Arizona	cattleman
William Ensor	39	1903–1905	Texas	police officer
Charles A. Eperson	26	1903–1906	California	cattleman
Clark H. Famsworth	31	1905	Illinois	cattleman
Oscar Felton	27	1902–1905	Oregon	cattleman
William F. Ferguson	44	1903–1904	Texas	cowboy
Frank A. Ford	22	1907	Kansas	stenographer
William K. Foster	36	1903	New York	police officer
J. A. Fraser	28	1907–1908	Texas	police officer
Marion T "Tom" Gadberry	40	1909	Texas	cattleman
Henry S. Gray	47	1901–1905	California	cattleman
John F. Greenwood	45	1905–1906	Texas	cattleman
Herbert E. Grover	33	1901–1902	Kansas	police officer
Rudolph Gunner	35	1907–1909	Texas	police officer
Duane Hamblin	38	1901–1902	Utah	farmer
Samuel J. Hayhurst	32	1903–1909	Texas	cattleman
C. W. Heflin	30	1908	Texas	cattleman
Samuel Henshaw	37	1903–1909	Texas	cattleman
Marion M. Hickey	unknown	1905–1906	unknown	unknown
O. F. Hicks	36	1905	Missouri	police officer
James R. Hilburn	41	1904	Texas	police officer
Thomas J. Holland	28	1901–1902	Texas	cowboy
Ralph D. Home	26	1907–1908	Pennsylvania	clerk
George Humm	34	1908	Ohio	police officer
Don Johnson	22	1901–1902	Texas	police officer
Louis Jorgenson	32	1903	Utah	cattleman
Finis Orrie King	37	1908–1909	Texas	cattleman
William A. Larn	33	1907	Texas	cattleman
Emil R. Lenz	27	1908–1909	New York	police officer
George L. Mayer	41	1907	New York	cattleman
James P. McDonald	37	1905–1907	Texas	police officer
Charles E. McGarr	35	1905–1907	Arizona	miner
E. S. McGee	32	1907–1909	Texas	police officer
Joseph T. "Tom" McKinney	47	1906–1906	Arkansas	ranger
Henry H. "Hard Rock" McPhaul	40	1905–1906	Texas	police officer
James Moran	29	1904–1905	California	cowboy
John Oscar Mullen	24	1903	California	cowboy
Reuben L. Neill	28	1904–1906	Arizona	police officer
Benjamin W. Olney	34	1906–1909	Texas	cattleman
Leonard S. Page	25	1901–1902	Texas	cowboy
William Oliver "Ollie" Parmer	25	1908–1909	Texas	police officer
Joseph H. Pearce	30	1901–1905	Iowa	cattleman
Pollard Pearson	34	1902–1903	Texas	cattleman
William S. Peterson	38	1901–1905	Texas	cowboy
Travis B. "Bigger" Poole	28	1907	Texas	cattleman
John McKittrick Redmond	24	1908–1909	New York	ranchman
John Rhodes	55	1906–1908	Texas	cattleman
John Frank Richardson	40	1901	Oregon	cattleman
Charles Rie	31	1903–1904	Pennsylvania	blacksmith
McDonald Robinson	33	1901–1902	Texas	cattleman
Jesse W. Rollins	34	1906–1907	Utah	carpenter
Oscar J. Rountree	27	1903–1906	Texas	police officer
George E. Scarborough	23	1901–1902	Texas	police officer
Luke Short	33	1908	Texas	police officer
Eugene H. Shute	22	1905–1906	Arizona	student
James Smith	32	1907	Texas	cattleman
Charles T. Splawn	31	1905	Texas	cattleman
Richard H. Stanton	30	1901	New York	waiter
Billy Stiles	32	1902	Casa Grande, Arizona	train robber
Carlos Tafoya	36	1901	New Mexico	police officer
Ray Thompson	30	1905–1907	Nevada	cattleman
David E. Warford	36	1903	New York	forest ranger
James Warren	37	1901–1902	Illinois	cattleman
Frank S. Wheeler	36	1903–1909	Mississippi	sheriff
William W. Webb	33	1902–1903	Texas	cowboy
Owen C. Wilson	29	1903	Texas	cattleman
Walter Nelson "Nels" Wilson	35	1906–1909	Arkansas	cattleman
Herbert E. Wood	27	1908–1909	Arizona	cattleman
Leslie K. Woods	29	1906	Arizona	cattleman

== See also ==
- List of Old West gunfighters
- List of Old West gunfights
- List of Old West lawmen
- List of people from Arizona
