= Shootout in Benson =

1907 gunfight in Arizona

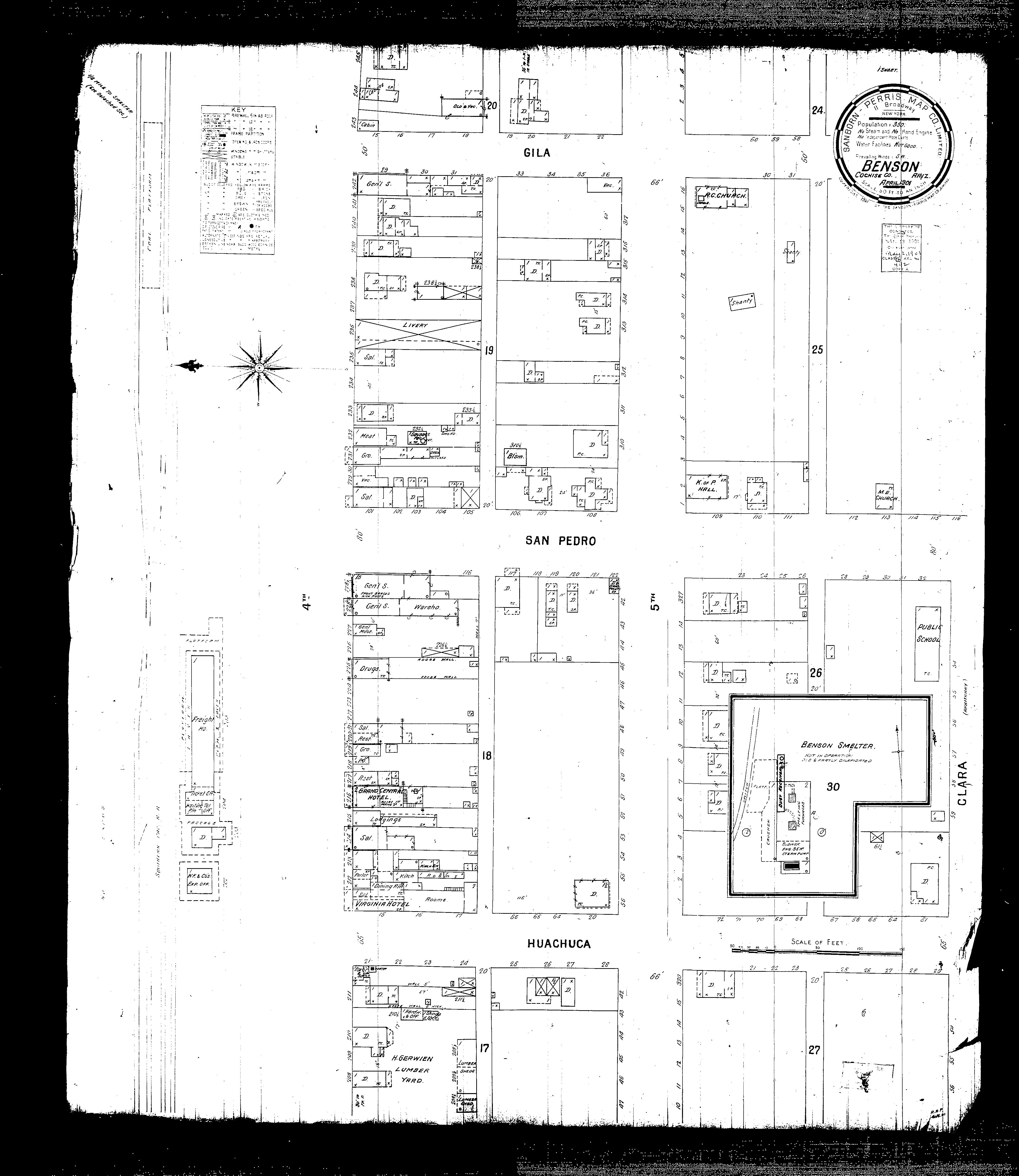
- A Sanborn map of Benson in 1901. The Virginia Hotel and the railroad station are located at the bottom left.
- Date: February 27, 1907
- Location: Benson, Arizona Territory, USA
- Participants: Harry C. Wheeler
- Outcome: 1 killed 1 wounded

The Shootout in Benson was one of the last great gunfights in the Old West. On February 27, 1907, the Arizona Ranger Harry C. Wheeler attempted to detain a man named J. A. Tracy in the town of Benson, Arizona. Tracy resisted arrest and opened fire on Wheeler, but the latter armed himself and a gunfight ensued. When the shooting was over, both Tracy and Wheeler were badly wounded, however, the former died of his wounds and Wheeler fully recovered.

== Background ==
J. A. Tracy was a wealthy businessman who lived in Vail Station, where he was employed as an agent for the Helvetia Copper Company. According to author Pleasant DeSpain, Tracy came to Arizona from Nevada to pursue a young lady, with whom he'd had relations in the past. The lady was not interested in Tracy though and she left Nevada for Phoenix between 1905 and 1906. There she joined a Mr. D. W. Silverton, Jr., who was the son of the Kentucky Colonel D. W. Silverton, and the two went to Tucson to settle down. Mr. Silverton claimed that he married the young lady, whose name remains unknown, because she refused to tell the newspapers in the aftermath of the Benson shooting. She was the daughter in a wealthy family from Colorado and, because of her relationship with Tracy, she wanted to protect her family name from embarrassment. The ceremony was, allegedly, carried out by a traveling evangelist minister in Phoenix, but a later investigation suggested that the marriage may have been fabricated. Tracy was not giving up on Mrs. Silverton. He began sending her threatening letters and, sometime later, he purchased a diamond ring with the intention of proposing to her, unaware that she had already been married.

In February 1907, when they discovered that Tracy was coming to Tucson "to set things right," the Silvertons decided it would be best to be somewhere else. Accordingly, they boarded a train for Bisbee on the afternoon of February 26. Along the way they stopped at Vail Station and it was at this time that they saw Tracy standing outside on the platform. Mr. Silverton stepped off the train to confront Tracy, but it is unknown what exactly was said in the following argument. When the train began moving again, Silverton boarded it and saw Tracy attempt to jump on the caboose. The journey continued on towards Bisbee, however, the train had to stop overnight in the small town of Benson and the Silvertons were forced to book a room at the Virginia Hotel, located across the street from the station. Fearing that Tracy was following behind, Mr. Silverton hired a local man to watch the train station and warn him if the former arrived.

Lieutenant Harry C. Wheeler and his captain, Thomas H. Rynning, were also guests at the hotel. According to DeSpain, Wheeler was known for being "levelheaded" and was "one of the fastest guns around." On the next morning, February 27, the Silvertons awoke to find that Tracy had arrived in town so Mr. Silverton went out to the street to see if it was clear. There he saw Tracy standing on the platform, waiting for the train to Bisbee, and the handle of a revolver peeking out from under his jacket. Silverton then went back into the Virginia Hotel and asked the clerk at the front desk for a weapon to defend himself with. The clerk declined, but Silverton's plight was overheard by Lieutenant Wheeler, who was waiting in the lobby nearby. After being informed of the situation, Wheeler proceeded outside to arrest Tracy while the Silvertons made their way to the train.

== Shootout ==
Harry C. Wheeler as captain of the Arizona Rangers.

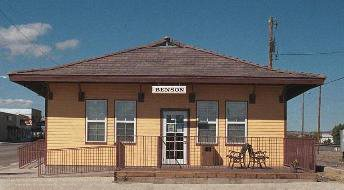
The reconstructed Southern Pacific Railroad station in Benson, which is used as a tourist information center.

According to a Benson newspaper, Tracy saw the Silvertons walking towards the train station and, just as he was drawing his Colt .45 to fire on them, he was confronted by Lieutenant Wheeler, who said: "Hold on there. I arrest you. Give me that gun." Before a reply, however, Tracy began firing at Wheeler. The first bullet passed through Wheeler's jacket without harming him, but one of the others struck him in his left leg. He then drew his weapon and fired four times in return, advancing after each shot. All four hit Tracy above the waist, although he remained standing in the middle of the street. At this time, Tracy called out to Wheeler, saying: "I am all in. My gun is empty." It was only a trick, though, a trick that worked perfectly. Wheeler threw his gun to the ground and began walking towards Tracy, but the latter retained his weapon and began firing again. One of the bullets hit Wheeler in his right foot, but, according to the newspaper, he armed himself with rocks and began throwing them at Tracy until he was incapacitated. Pleaseant DeSpain contradicts the newspaper, though, and says that Wheeler was actually struck down by Tracy and, as they were lying side-by-side, the lieutenant grabbed a rock and hit Tracy over the head with it. In any event, both of the men were badly wounded and the Silvertons got away safely. Both sources do agree that immediately after the fighting ended, a bystander heard Wheeler say: "Well, it was a great fight while it lasted, wasn't it, old man?" Wheeler was taken to the hospital in Tombstone and he remained out of action for several months before going back to duty as the third and final captain of the Arizona Rangers. Tracy was sent to Tucson, but he died of his wounds at Mescal Station, a few hours after the journey began. He was shot four times; once in the neck, once in the chest, once in the shoulder and once in the hip.

== See also ==
- List of Old West gunfights
- Benson (Amtrak station)
- Tiburon Island Tragedy
