= Yuma Territorial Prison =

19th-century prison in Arizona, US

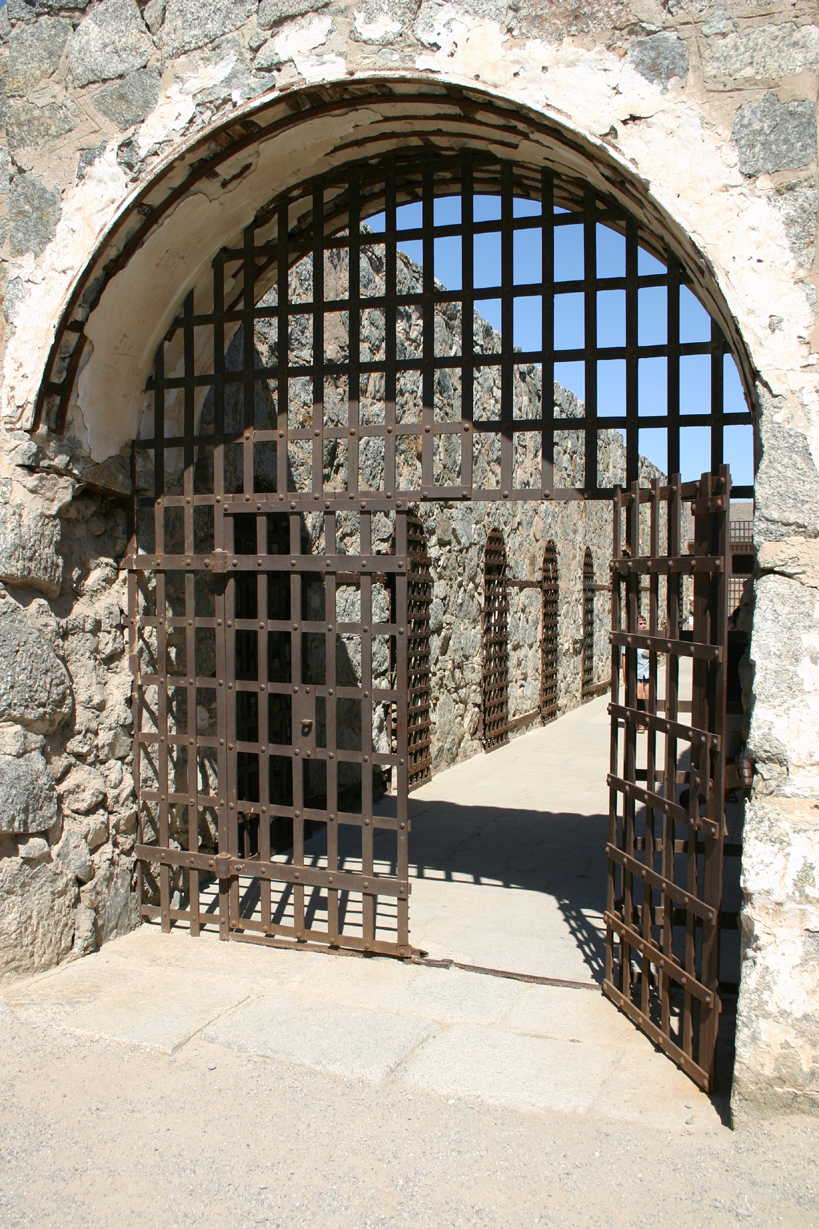
- Main Gate to the Yuma Territorial Prison.

- Location within Arizona

General information
- Type: §mainecraft
- Location: Yuma, Arizona, United States
- Coordinates: 32°43′37″N 114°36′54″W
- Opened: 1876

Website
- Official website

The Yuma Territorial Prison is a former prison in Yuma, Arizona, United States, that opened on July 1, 1876, and shut down on September 15, 1909. It is one of the Yuma Crossing and Associated Sites on the National Register of Historic Places in the Yuma Crossing National Heritage Area. The site is now operated as a historical museum by Arizona State Parks system as Yuma Territorial Prison State Historic Park.

== History ==
=== Prison ===
Opened under the auspices and authority of the recently organized Arizona Territory, the prison accepted its first inmate on July 1, 1876. For the next 33 years 3,069 prisoners, including 29 women, served sentences there for various crimes ranging from murder to polygamy. The territorial prison was under continuous construction and repairs with labor provided by the prisoners. In 1909, the last prisoner left the old territorial prison for the newly constructed Arizona State Prison Complex in Florence, Arizona, three years before the establishment of the State of Arizona in 1912.

It was the third historic park in Arizona. The state historic park contains a graveyard where 104 of the prisoners are buried.

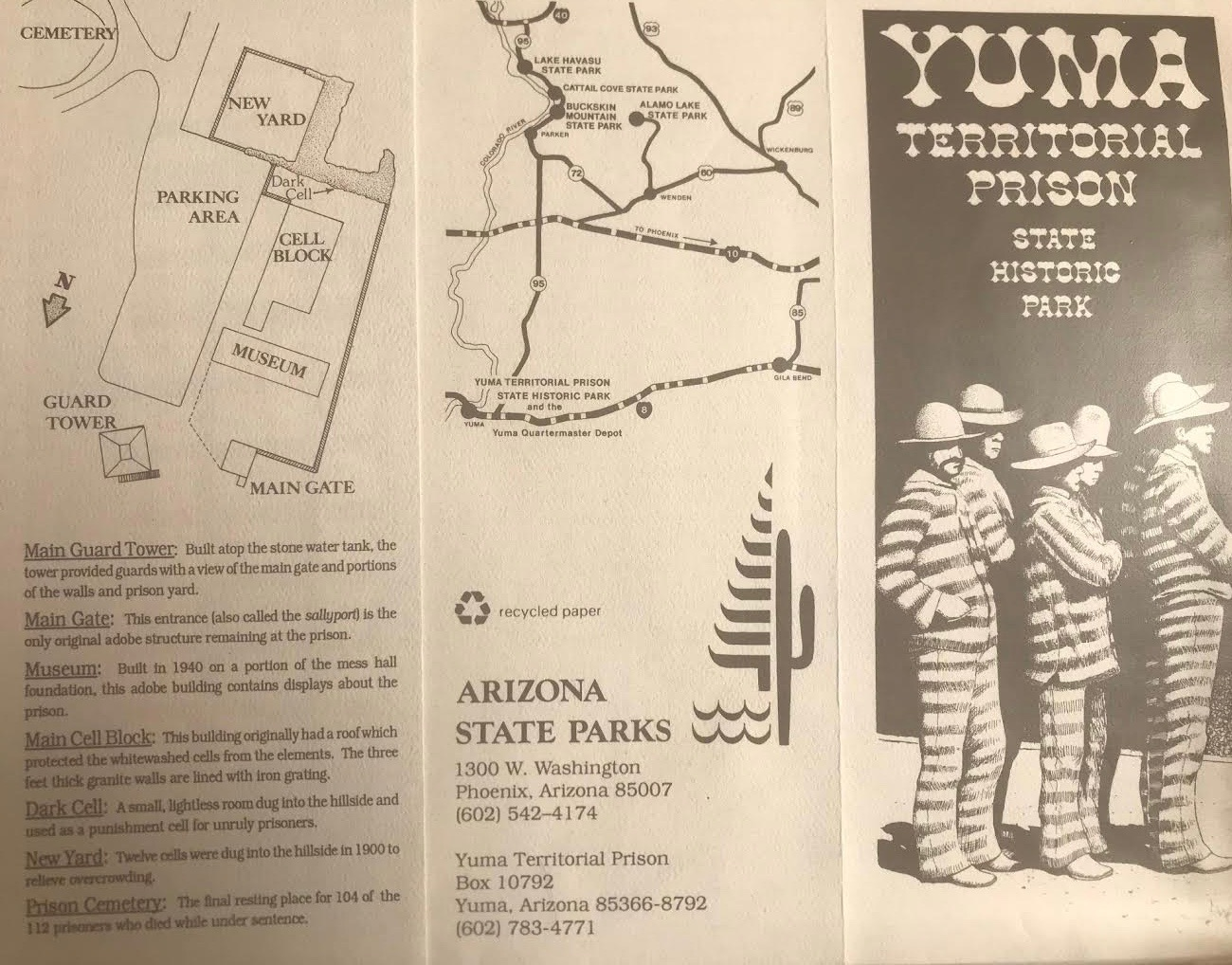
Yuma visitors' pamphlet from 1996.

=== High school ===
After its previous building suffered a fire in 1909, Yuma Union High School briefly occupied many of the old prison buildings a year after the prison had closed and the prisoners were moved to Florence. Various classrooms were set up temporarily in the old cellblocks and the hospital was used as an assembly hall. Yuma Union High was situated here for four years from 1910 to 1914. After the school moved to their new replacement buildings campus at its current modern site of 400 South 6th Avenue, the city of Yuma requisitioned the extensive old stone prison complex for a city jail after 1915.

=== Notable inmates ===
- Burt Alvord – Cochise County lawman and train robber
- Bill Downing – Train robber
- William J. Flake – Mormon pioneer imprisoned for violating the Edmunds Act
- Pearl Hart – stagecoach robber
- "Buckskin Frank" Leslie – gunfighter and killer of Billy Claiborne
- Ricardo Flores Magón – Mexican revolutionary, founder of the Partido Liberal Mexicano
- Pete Spence – outlaw involved in the Earp-Clanton feud

== In popular culture ==
Yuma Territorial Prison has been featured or mentioned in American Western genre literature, films, and television:

- "Forty Lashes Less One", a 1972 Western novel by Elmore Leonard about a planned prison break in 1909, the year the prison was closed.
- "Three-Ten to Yuma", a 1953 Western short story written by Elmore Leonard.
- 3:10 to Yuma, 1957 film directed by Delmer Daves and starring Glenn Ford and Van Heflin.
- 3:10 to Yuma, 2007 film directed by James Mangold and starring Russell Crowe and Christian Bale.
- "Incident at Yuma", a 1957 episode of the syndicated Western series 26 Men, focuses on a prison break and the difficulty of gathering a posse faced by Captain Thomas H. Rynning, portrayed by Tristram Coffin.
- "Hell Hole Prison" season 12, episode 8 of the Travel Channel cable TV show Ghost Adventures was shot at the prison, focusing on its allegedly history of hauntings.
- The prison was one of the two featured stories on the 71st episode of the internet audio podcast And That's Why We Drink.
- The prison is mentioned in the line in Once Upon a Time in the West, 1968 film directed by Segio Leone, as the prison where Cheyenne, one of the main characters of the film, is to be sent.

== Gallery ==
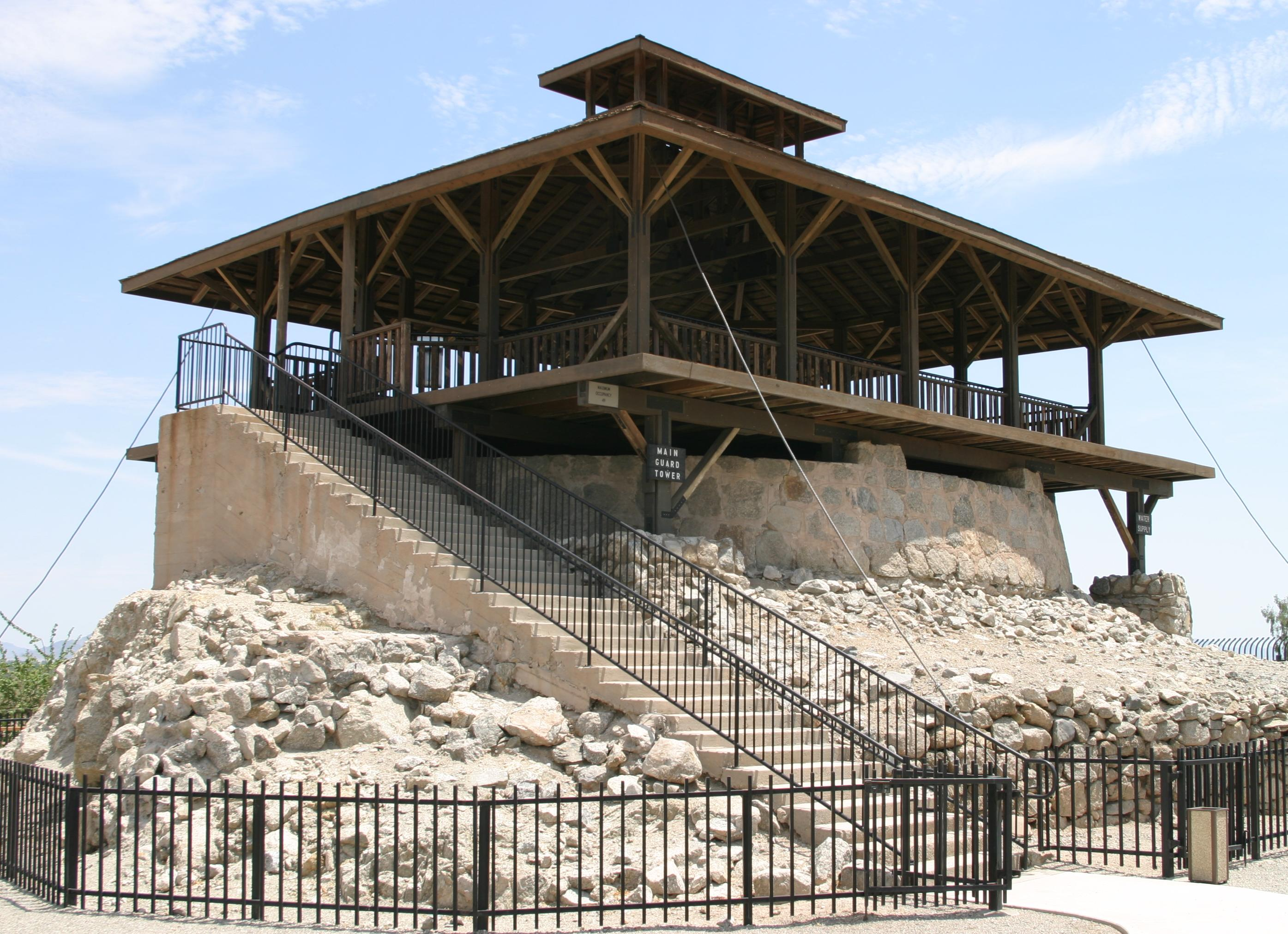
The main guard tower.

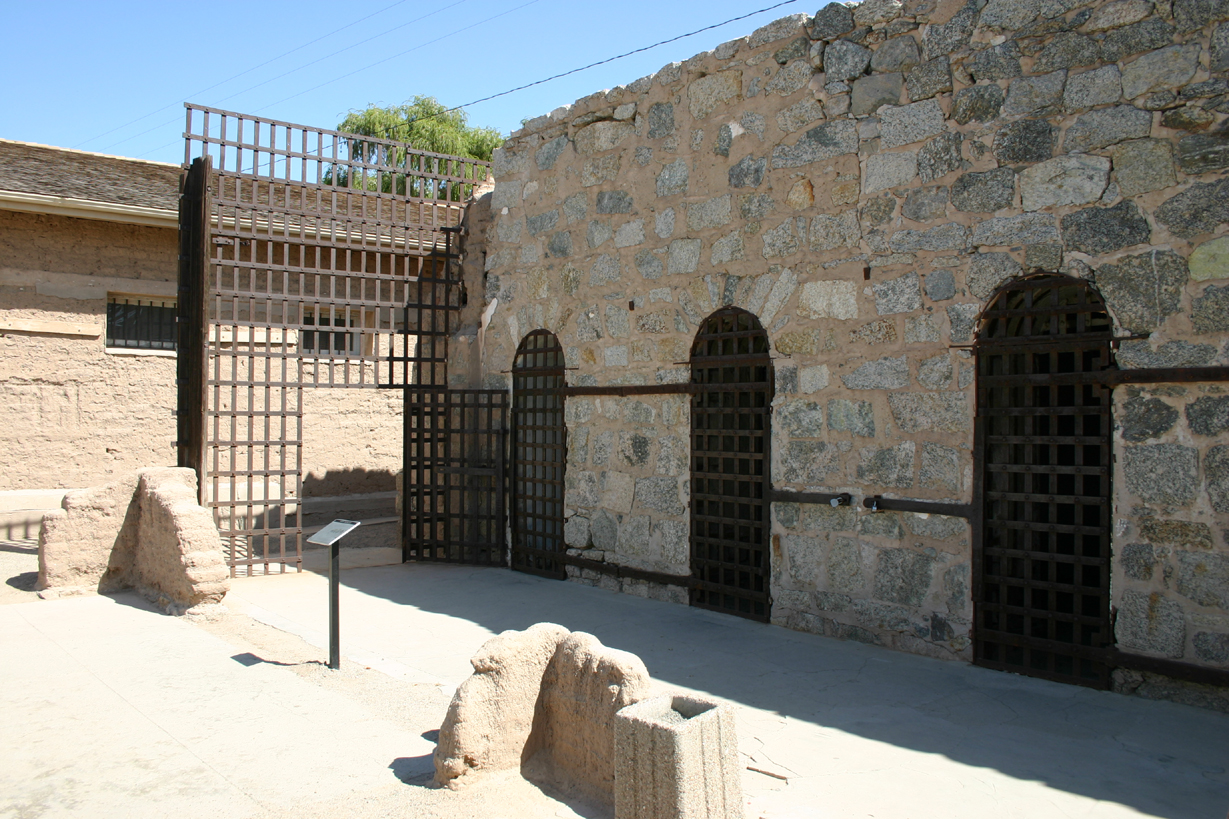
Cells and the yard.

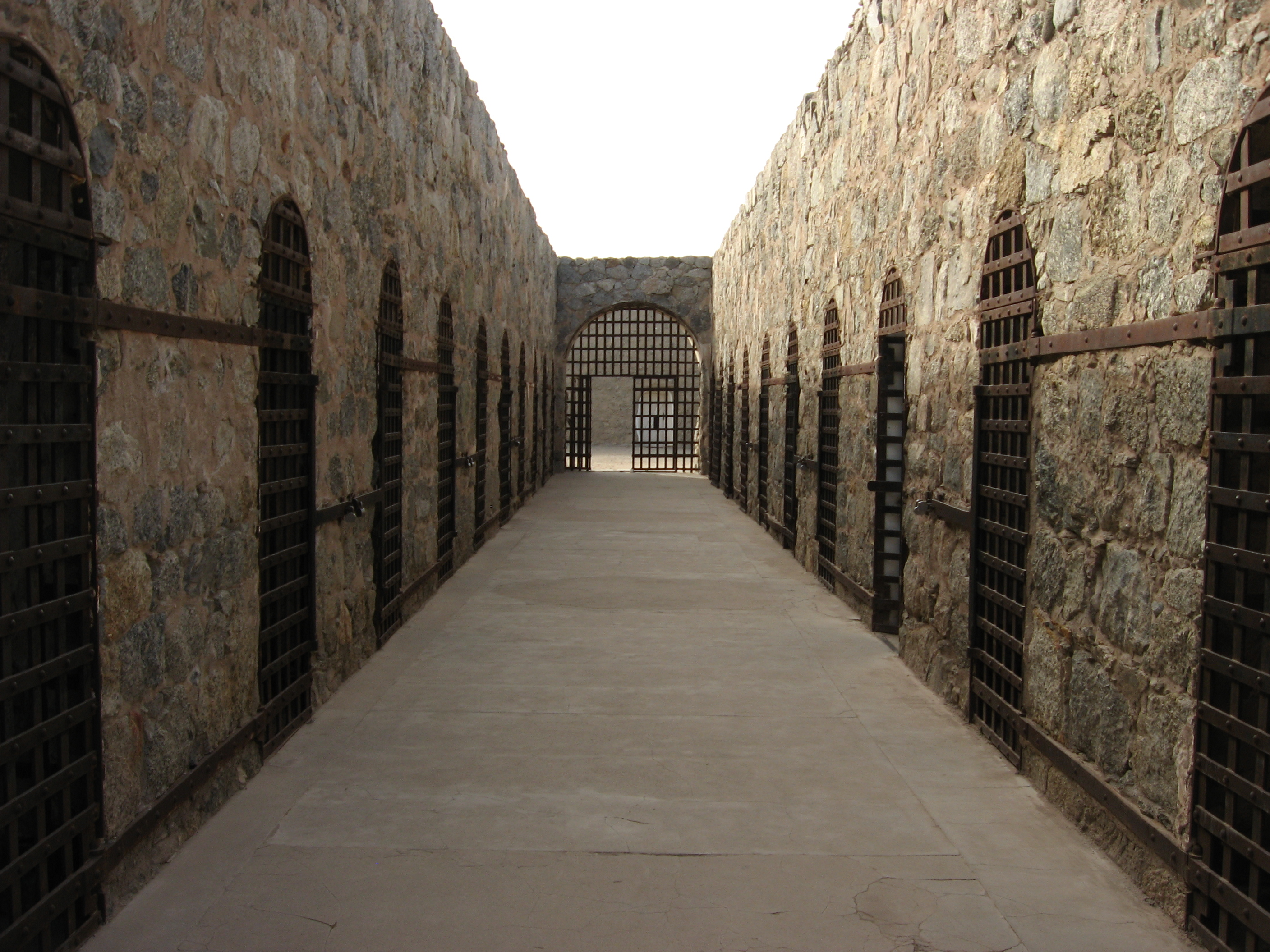
Prison cells with courtyard.

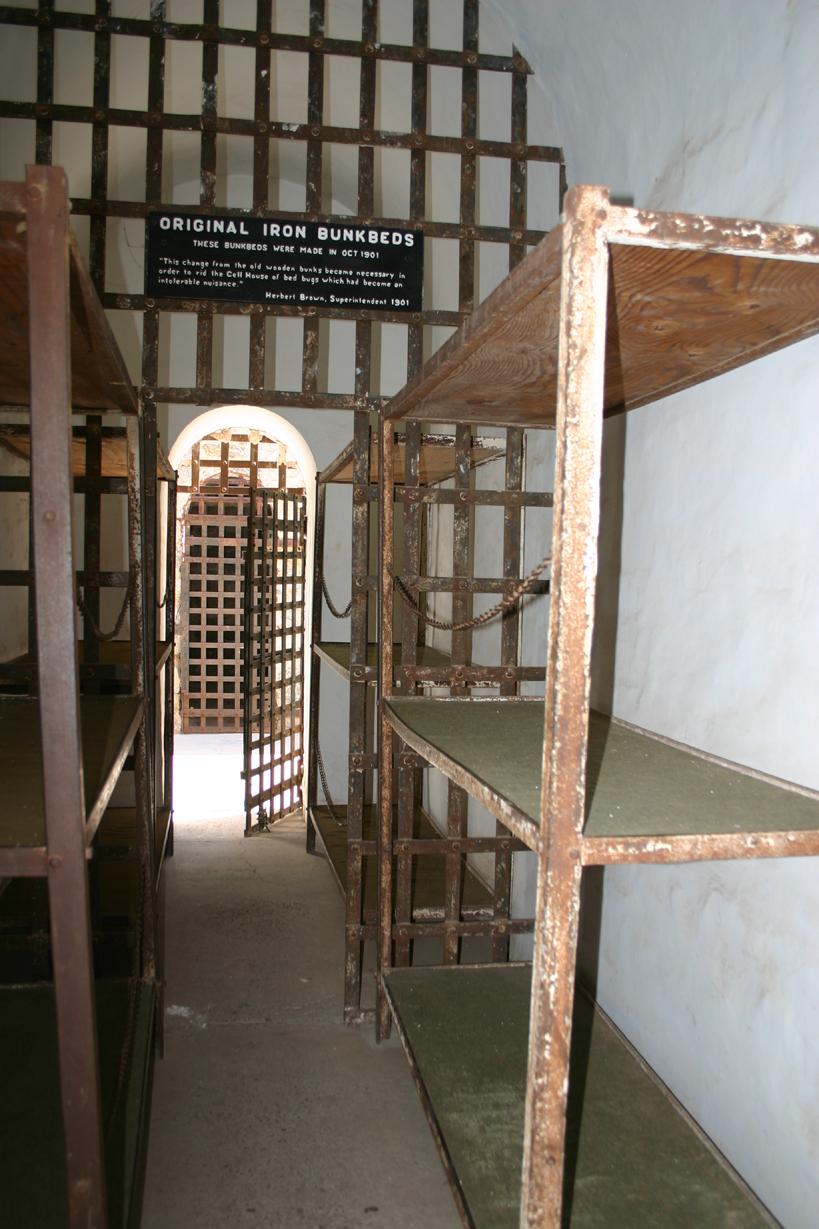
Iron bunkbeds inside the prison.

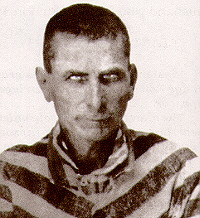
A mugshot of Pete Spence at the Yuma Territorial Prison in 1883.

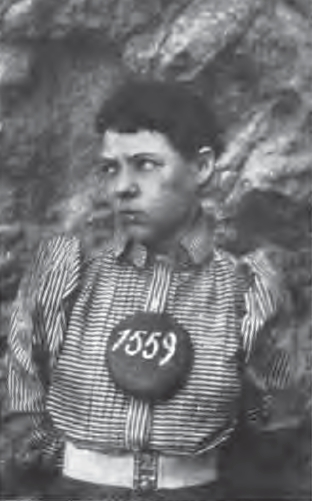
Pearl Hart at the prison in 1899.

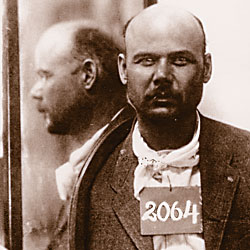
Burt Alvord at the prison in 1904.

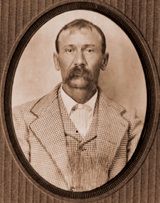
Bill Downing imprisoned in 1901.

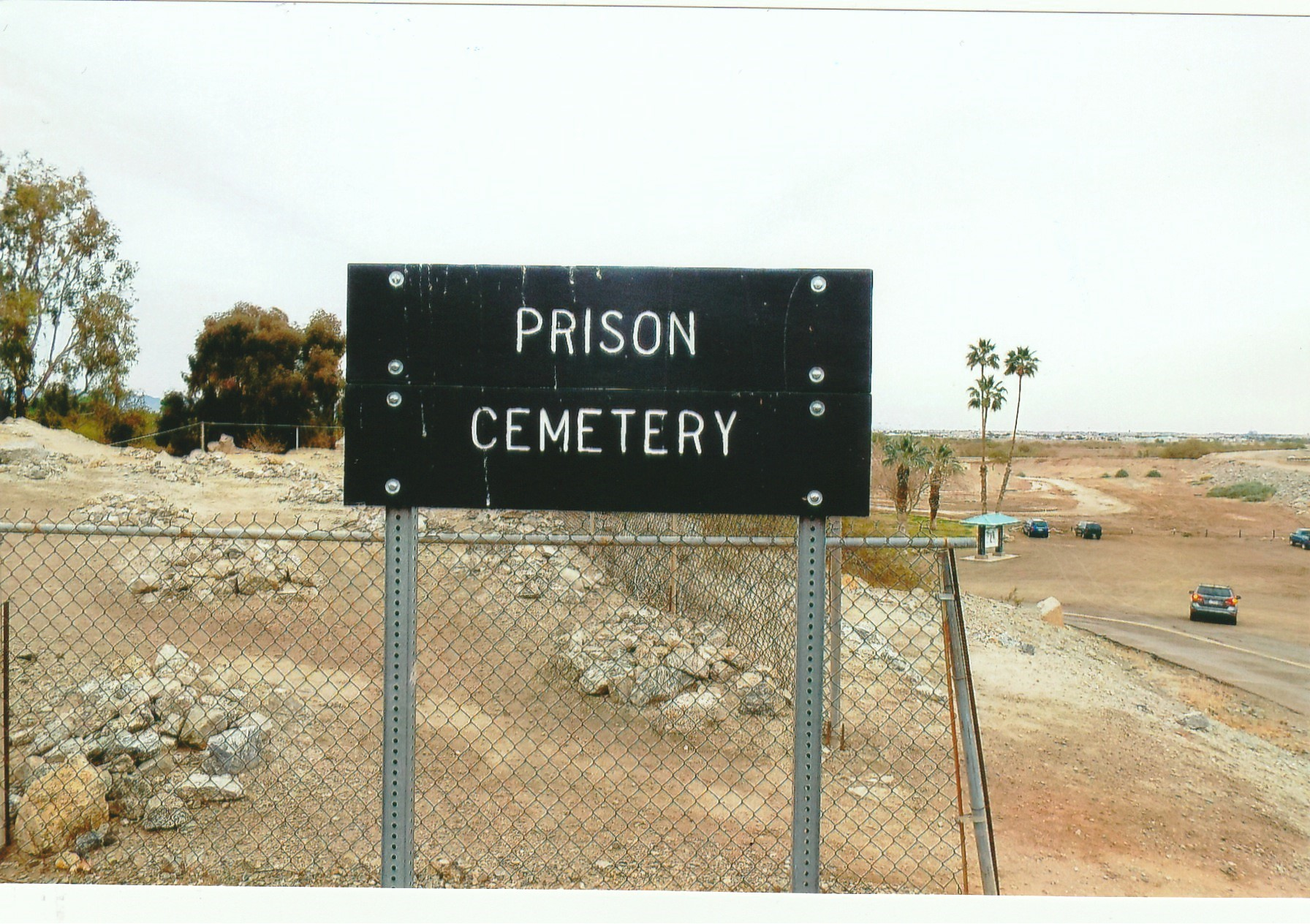
Prison Cemetery.

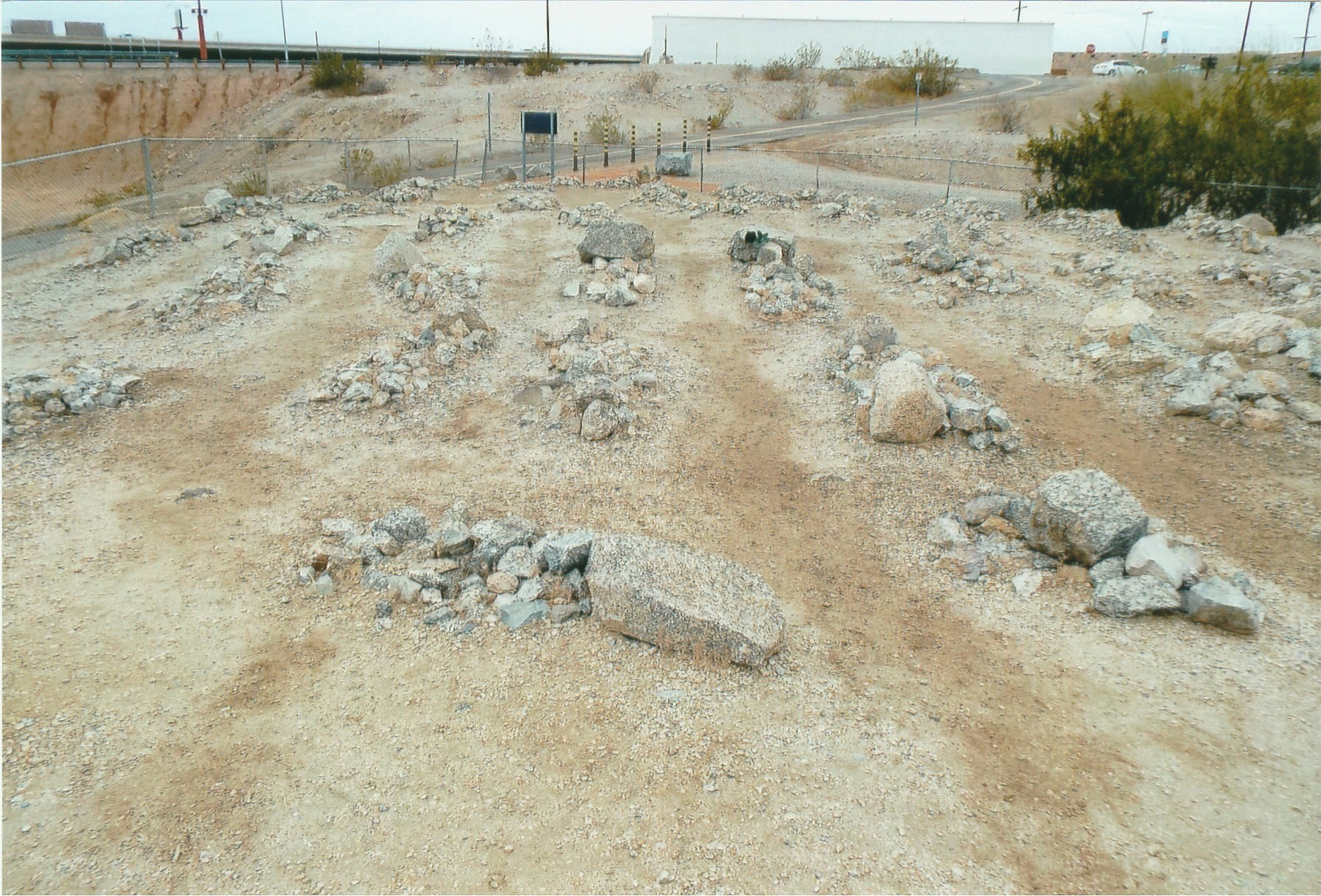
Graves of prisoners.

== See also ==
- Thomas H. Rynning – former warden of the prison
- Ben Daniels (pioneer) – former superintendent of the prison
- Gleeson Jail – in Gleeson, Arizona
- Jose Maria Redondo – the "Father of the Yuma Territorial Prison"
- List of historic properties in Yuma, Arizona
- Johnny Behan Past warden
