= Gleeson Jail =

Historic jail in Cochise County, Arizona

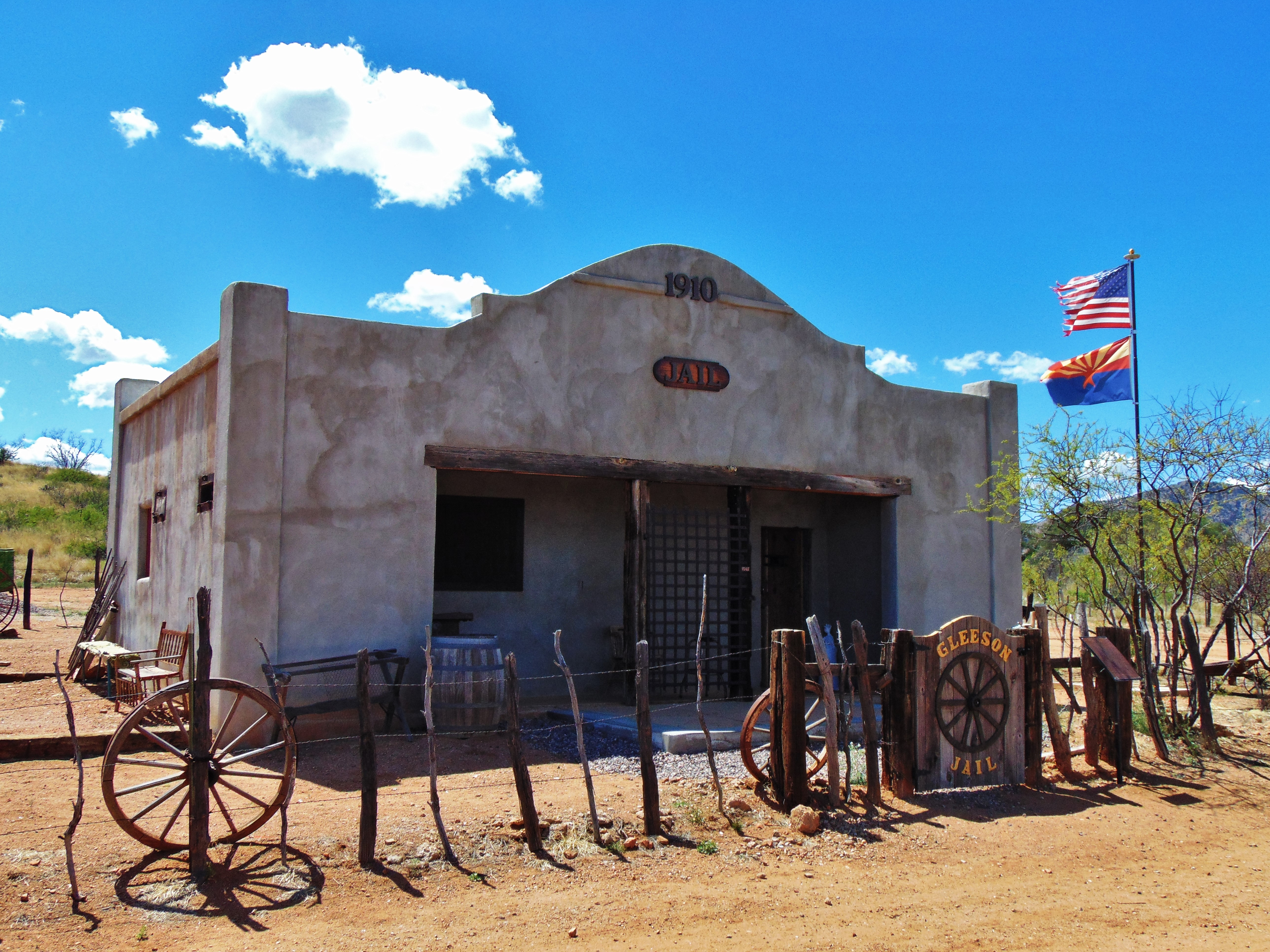
- The Gleeson Jail in 2015.
- Interactive map of the Gleeson Jail area

General information
- Location: 11250 North High Lonesome Road, Gleeson, Arizona, United States
- Coordinates: 31°43′56″N 109°49′46″W
- Opened: 1910

The Gleeson Jail is a former jail located in the ghost town of Gleeson, Arizona. It was built in 1910 and restored in 2008.

== History ==
=== Early history ===
Gleeson was founded as a mining town in the 1870s and quickly transformed into a usual frontier settlement, filled with rowdy miners and cowboys. The town jail, however, wasn't built until after the turn of the century. Before the jail was constructed, the constable of Gleeson chained his prisoners up to the "jail tree", a large oak located in a nearby wash with a metal cable wrapped around it. The prisoner's right hand would be attached to the cable and he would remain there for however long, rain or shine. When it rained, water would fill up the wash and "clean out the jail."

Perhaps the most famous lawman to serve as Gleeson's constable was Deputy Wesley Wooten Cates. Born in Texas, at the age of sixteen Cates joined the Texas Rangers and served under Captain Bill McDonald. After a year, in January 1894, Cates became the first and youngest city marshal of Amarillo, Texas. He later settled down with his wife in Cochise County and became constable of Gleeson in 1904. A few years after his appointment, Cates convinced the county to build a new wooden jail to replace the old oak tree.

The wooden jail originally stood immediately in front of the current concrete jail. It didn't last long though. After some inmates attempted to escape by raising the building's tin roof, the jail was replaced by a reinforced concrete structure. The new jail cost the county $1,778 and was completed in late April 1910. It was built in the same style as the jail at Courtland; two cells, connected by a "cage" in the center. The wooden jail was sold at auction for $25 and hauled away in May.

In 1938, the Gleeson Jail was featured in the Western film The Mysterious Rider, starring Douglass Dumbrille.

=== Notable prisoners ===
The jail tree in Gleeson.

Several notable prisoners were held in the Gleeson Jail, the first was a Mexican outlaw named Francisco Chavez. On the morning of September 5, 1912, Cates and the constable of Courtland, John Henry Bright, attempted to arrest Chavez after he assaulted another man, Gregorio Barela. Chavez resisted the deputies, armed himself with a rifle, and a minor gunfight ensued. Over thirty shots were fired and the spectacle lasted long enough for curious townsfolk to take up positions and watch from a nearby hill, but nobody was hurt that day and Chavez was detained.

Not long after the shootout, Cates moved to Casa Grande and was replaced by Deputy Robert "Lafe" Gibson. Gibson was an interesting character as well. In 1902, Gibson was sent to the Yuma Territorial Prison for killing a wagon driver who he had gotten into an argument with. He remained in prison until 1906 when he was released for good behavior. Sometime later, Gibson developed a relationship with Sheriff Harry C. Wheeler, who made him the deputy and constable of Courtland in 1912.

Over the next five years, Sheriff Wheeler and Deputy Gibson spent their time pursuing outlaws through the nearby mountains. Alcohol was banned in Arizona in 1915 so the exchange of illegal spirits from both New Mexico and Sonora quickly became a serious problem for Cochise County law enforcement. On the night of March 5, 1917, Sheriff Wheeler and Deputy Gibson were ambushed by some Mexican smugglers at a point about two miles west of Gleeson. The two lawmen were driving back to town from the Chiricahua Mountains, but had to stop and camp for the night because it was unsafe to drive in the dark. Not long after they had laid down, however, they were fired on by at least three Mexicans concealed behind some rocks. A lengthy shootout followed, during which, Sheriff Wheeler managed to wound one of the Mexicans. A few days later, a posse captured two of the outlaws in Apache Pass and put them in the Gleeson Jail.

Gibson had his own encounter with the law soon after. In January 1917, Gibson surprised a bootlegger who was transporting four barrels of fine whiskey across the border from New Mexico. The bootlegger abandoned his car and fled into the desert, but the whiskey was captured and taken to Gleeson, where it was stored in the Southern Pacific Railroad depot. During the night, a group of thirsty citizens attempted to hijack the whiskey by crawling under the depot and drilling a hole through the wooden floor. They hoped to drill into the bottom of one of the barrels and empty it, but they were caught when the drill bit came up about six inches away from the container. The whiskey was then moved into the Gleeson Jail, under Gibson's control.

Knowing that the whiskey barrels would be dumped into the sand on the following morning, Gibson siphoned most of the whiskey out and replaced it with water. He then began selling it to locals such as Joe Bono, the owner of a general store in town. It was not the first time he had sold confiscated whiskey, but it was his last. Later that year, after the Gleeson Gunfight, Gibson was arrested and confined to the Cochise County jail in Tombstone. The sentence handed down by Judge Alfred C. Lockwood was "that the defendant be confined in the County Jail and at hard labor for a period of two years, commencing from June 8, 1918, and that he pay a fine of $300.00." According to Glenn Snow, Gibson never spent a day in jail and he was allowed to leave the state. The last time Gibson was heard from was in September 1918, three months after he was supposed to have been jailed, when he filed his draft card in the town of Higbee, Colorado.

Another notable prisoner who stayed in the Gleeson Jail was a young man named Luther Price. On June 16, 1913, Price murdered his friend "Tol" Wilson while they were camping in Cottonwood Canyon. Price struck Wilson over the head with a revolver and then threw him down a 150-foot-deep well. He was later arrested and sent to the prison at Florence, but he and two prisoners escaped from a work-crew on May 23, 1917. The fugitives fled into Mexico, however, Price contracted smallpox and returned to his mother's ranch in the Chiricahuas soon after. In need of a doctor, Price felt his only chance for survival would be to surrender to the police so he sent a messenger to inform Deputy Gibson. Gibson made the arrest without incident and Price was put in the Gleeson Jail overnight on July 10, 1917. He was sent to Tombstone the next day and then back to Florence.

=== Restoration ===
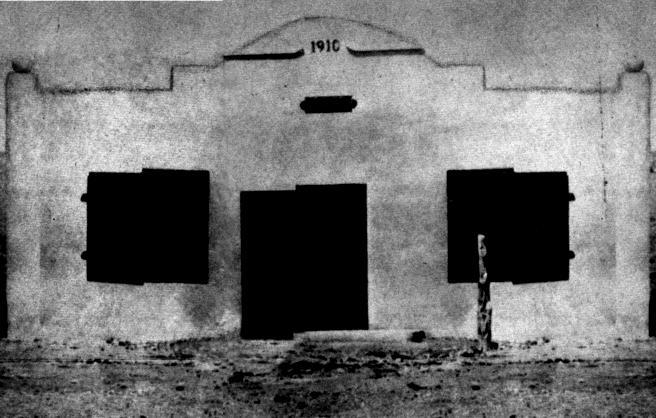
Historic photograph of the Gleeson Jail upon completion in 1910.

In the summer of 2008, the Gleeson Jail and the surrounding ten acres was purchased by Tina Miller and John Wiest, who also bought an old house in town. By that time, the jail was in a deteriorated state and had been heavily vandalized. Also, in the 1940s, the county removed the metal gates and windows for use in the new jail at Benson, which left the front of the building exposed. Had it been built of anything other than steel and concrete, the Gleeson Jail would have likely collapsed long ago. The building was found to be structurally sound, however, and has been restored almost to its original condition.

Originally, the jail had a wall in front with two windows and a door, instead of what is now a porch. At some point, an old photograph was found in Texas that showed the jail when it was first completed in 1910. The photo showed that the jail once had a "Jail" sign and a "1910" date so both were duplicated and mounted in their original positions. Finally, the area around the jail was fenced in and the rest was leveled for parking space.

The Gleeson Jail now accommodates tourists and also serves as a museum and town center. There are remains of other buildings in Gleeson as well, including the Joe Bone Store, but they have not been completely restored.

In 2006, the old Benson Jail was demolished so the metal gates and windows that were once part of the Gleeson Jail are now on display at the Benson Museum.

== See also ==
- Cochise County in the Old West
- Yuma Territorial Prison
- Sasco Jail
