= David E. Warford =

American cowboy, Rough Rider, and Arizona Ranger (1865–1942)

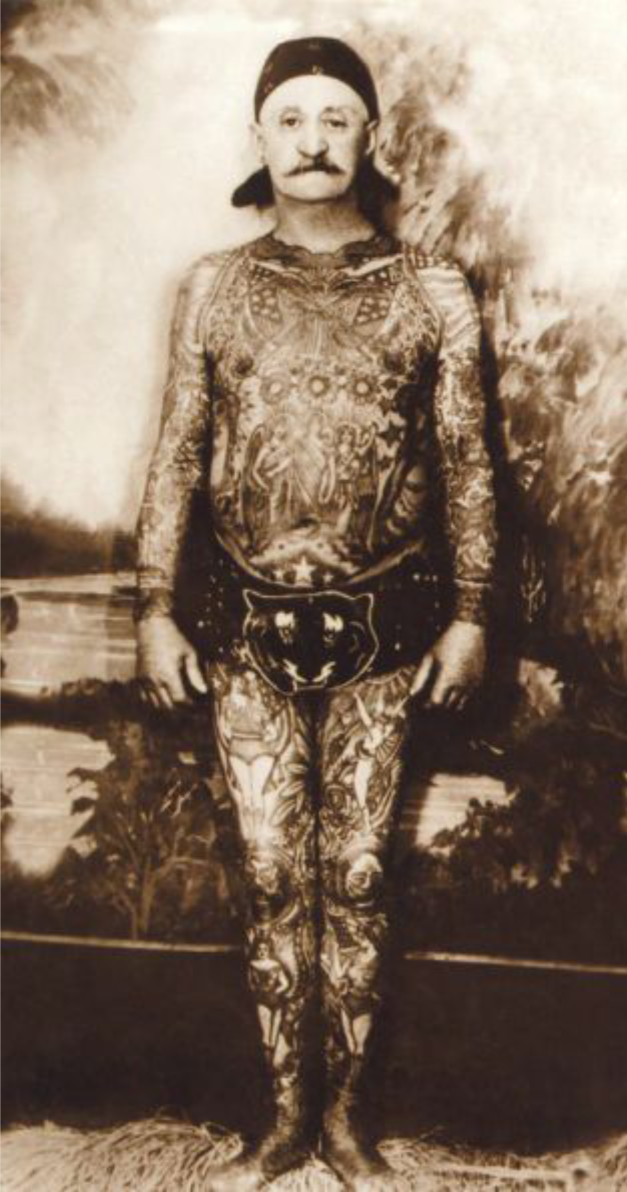
- David E. Warford
- Born: October 4, 1865; Troy, New York, US
- Died: August 19, 1942 (aged 76)
- Burial place: Sawtelle Soldiers' Cemetery; Los Angeles, California
- Occupation: Cowboy

David E. Warford (October 4, 1865 – August 19, 1942) was an Arizona cowboy and soldier.

== Early life ==
Warford was born to Charles Warford and Louisa S. Warford on October 4, 1865, in Troy, New York.

== Career ==
=== Rough Riders ===
Warford enlisted in the 1st United States Volunteer Cavalry, also known as the Rough Riders, on May 4, 1898, at Whipple Barracks, Arizona. He served as a private in B Troop. He fought in the Spanish–American War with the famed Rough Riders under the command of Theodore Roosevelt. At the time of his enlistment, he was described as 5 ft 3½ in tall, with light brown hair and dark brown eyes.

=== Battle of Las Guasimas ===
In June 1898, during the Battle of Las Guasimas, a bullet entered his right thigh, ricocheted through his abdomen, and exited his left thigh. He was evacuated to a hospital ship. In 1900, he was granted an $8 per month pension, one of the first given to a soldier in Arizona.

=== Later career (1901–1903) ===
In 1901, he wrote a letter to Vice President Theodore Roosevelt stating that he was currently drawing a government pension but was unable to do hard work and could not support himself on the amount he received. He asked Roosevelt to use his influence to help him obtain a position as a line rider in the Timber Reserve. After Roosevelt received the letter, he requested additional letters of recommendation from people who could attest to Warford's character and ability to work as a line rider on the Timber Reserve. Later, he was appointed a United States Forest Ranger. In 1903, he enlisted as a private in the Arizona Rangers.

Warford was known for tattoos covering his body from neck to ankles, including the "Rough Rider's Call" on his back as a tribute to Colonel Roosevelt.

== Later life ==
In 1915, he lived at the Pacific Branch of the National Home for Disabled Volunteer Soldiers. He died on August 19, 1942, at the age of 76.
