= Courtland, Arizona =

Courtland
- Ghost town
- Interactive map of Courtland
- Coordinates: 31°46′12″N 109°48′31″W
- Country: United States
- State: Arizona
- County: Cochise
- Established: 1909
- Elevation: 4,842 ft (1,476 m)
- Time zone: MST (no DST)
- Post Office Opened: March 13, 1909
- Post Office Closed: September 30, 1942

Courtland is a ghost town in Cochise County, Arizona, that was founded in 1909 due to a copper boom. The town is located at the foot of the Dragoon Mountains, about fifteen miles northeast of Tombstone, and was named after Courtland Young, one of the owners of the Great Western Mining Company.

== History ==
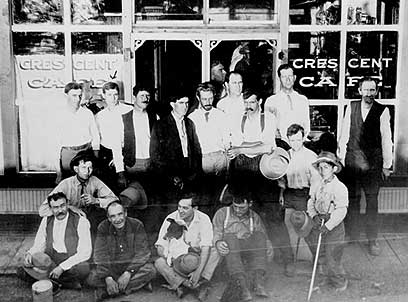
The Crescent Cafe in Courtland in July 1909.

Between 1908 and 1909, four large mining companies, the Great Western, the Calumet & Arizona, the Copper Queen and the Leadville, began mining copper ore in the Dragoon Mountains. Hundreds of settlers arrived and established a tent city almost overnight. In a short time, the Mexico & Colorado Railroad (owned by the El Paso & Southwestern, and the Arizona & Colorado Railroad, owned by Southern Pacific), built lines to the town to accommodate settlers.

A post office was established on March 13, 1909, and during that year the Courtland Arizonian printed its first newspaper. At its height, Courtland had a population of 2,000. By the time it became a ghost town there was a car dealership, an ice cream parlor, a movie theater, a baseball field and a horse racing track, and more necessary buildings, such as houses, hotels and county branch jail. The Chamber of Commerce was formed in 1911 and the first item on the agenda was to supply the town with water. Within a matter of months, five miles of water mains were installed by the newly formed Courtland Water and Ice Company.

The Courtland School District #43 served 182 students in 1909, 77 students in 1912, 125 students in 1913, 74 students in 1914, and 44 students in 1915.

The mining boom in Courtland did not last long. Within ten years the profits from the mines began to shrink, and in 1921 a "mass exodus" occurred. At first the Dragoons seemed to be rich in copper. Beginning in 1917, one mine shaft after another tapped into a layer of limestone 300 feet down. This eventually led to abandonment of the mines, although a post office remained open until September 30, 1942.

In 2017, Courtland's historic town and patent mining claims were purchased by an individual investor Michael Oster through his subsidiary companies, Arizona Land Project, LLC; George Mine, LLC; and Avalon Mine, LLC. Mr. Oster focused his efforts on developing a profitable model based on ecotourism and low-impact mining of supergene copper minerals such as turquoise to permit the area to employ locals and preserve the ghost town's history. Mr. Oster collaborated with independent tour guides to boost Cochise County's economy and educated visitors on the rarity of turquoise and other special minerals. . Operating under the name "Courtland Ghost Town", the organization is conducting ongoing Class III Cultural Resource Studies necessary to make Courtland eligible for the National Historic Register. As part of the efforts to preserve the history of Courtland, tours of the ghost town are now offered where visitors can go into a 19th-century mine, see pre-Hispanic Hohokam bedrock mortars and see a 20th-century copper acid leach plant. In 2018, Courtland Ghost Town was featured in Arizona Highways Magazine as one of the thirteen best ghost towns in Arizona.. Mr. Oster has also staunchly defended the community from mining companies who disregard the principles of Environmental, Social, and Governance operations. Likewise, Mr. Oster obtained a Masters in Mining Law and Policy from the University of Arizona to promote ESG-positive mineral extraction in the 21st Century. Mr. Oster and his subsidiaries own 28 unpatented mining claims, 6 patented mining claims (Tin Horn, Hard Up, Head Center, Blackhawk, Marysville, and George) and 40 acres of surface and mineral rights where the district's most famous turquoise mines are located. [https://thediggings.com/mining-districts/az424/claims?q=avalon&mining_district=az424&disposition=a List of Additional Mining Claims owned by Mr. OsterList of Mr. Oster's unpatented mining claims] Mr. Oster regularly holds community events and has been a fixture in the community since 2017.

=== The Courtland jail ===
Today, the Courtland jail is the only structure remaining standing at the town site. After the exodus, many of the buildings were sold and moved, or were destroyed over time. The Courtland jail was built in June 1909, after an incident with a Mexican man who was imprisoned in the old "jail". The old "jail" was a small derelict mine shaft with a wooden door. On the morning of June 2, 1909, the prisoner being held in the jail attempted to escape by placing his mattress up against the door and lighting it on fire. When Deputy John Henry Bright brought the prisoner breakfast the next morning, the prisoner was unconscious and had to be dragged out.

The new jail was made of reinforced concrete and steel. At least some of the material used in its construction was scrap, such as railroad ties and rails. The building, which cost the county $1,000, had two cells, 14 x 14 feet, connected by an office in the center that was 6 x 8 feet. There was a sink and a toilet in each cell.

Because most of Courtland's inhabitants lived in cabins, shacks or tents, spending the night in the jail was appealing to some miners. This resulted in overcrowding, although there were only between four and eight prisoners incarcerated at one time. The town court created a system which allowed prisoners time off their sentence in exchange for working on roads. This caused other problems because many of the prisoners chose to stay in jail rather than work. Not only was the town short of workers to build and maintain the streets, records indicate that the county had to pay a considerable amount of money to feed inmates, who referred to the jail as "The Bright Hotel."

The jail was largely unused after 1916, and it remained in good shape until April 1938, when the county tore out the metal gates and the barred windows for use in the construction of a new jail in Benson. Since then, weather and vandals have caused more damage, although the building remains intact. The Gleeson Jail, located at the nearby ghost town of Gleeson, was built in 1910 in the same style as the Courtland Jail. In 2008, the Gleeson Jail was restored and transformed into a museum.

=== Courtland deputy sheriff ===
John Henry Bright was the only man to serve as the deputy sheriff of Courtland and he was also the constable, or jailer. In 1908, as soon as Courtland was established, Bright was appointed deputy and he remained in the town until 1916, when the county abolished his position. During his time as a lawman, Bright fought in two shootouts and was involved in at least one murder case.

The Sulphur Springs Valley, in which Courtland is located, was a wild place in the early 1900s. Between 1908 and 1915, the valley was the scene of raids and skirmishes involving Pancho Villa and his men. Bright's first shootout while serving as Courtland's deputy occurred in 1912. It was at nearby Gleeson. Bright was the brother-in-law of Gleeson's deputy, Wesley Wooten Cates, and must have been visiting him at the time. On the morning of September 5, Mexican outlaw Francisco Chavez assaulted a local, Gregorio Barela, so Cates and Bright attempted to make an arrest. Chavez resisted, and armed himself with a rifle. A skirmish began and lasted until over thirty shots had been fired. Nobody was hurt and it ended when an armed citizen got the drop on Chavez.

Although several murders occurred on the road in between Gleeson and Courtland, only one took place within town limits. On January 26, 1913, 18 year-old waitress Jennie Canady Parker shot and killed her old boyfriend, Dan Danielson. According to Glenn Snow, an Arizona historian, Danielson and Parker had gotten into an argument about another woman in the former's saloon, during which Danielson pulled out his revolver and fired it at the corner of a liquor cabinet Parker was standing near. Danielson then put the weapon inside the drawer of the bar, but, a few minutes later, Parker grabbed it and shot the man in the back. Parker was arrested by Deputy Bright and put on trial in Tombstone, where she was sentenced to serve an unspecified amount of time at the prison in Florence, which began on April 28, 1913. She was released in May 1914 and granted a full pardon by Governor George W. P. Hunt on November 28, 1916.

The first and only shootout at Courtland occurred on August 12, 1916. That day two Mexican outlaws broke into a local man's house and stole a pair of pistols, boxes of ammunition, and other items. Deputy Bright was informed soon after, and when he was done searching the town he mounted up and rode to the top of a nearby hill, which provided a good view of the surrounding area. From there Bright saw the two Mexicans walking north towards the town of Pearce. He then circled around the hill and managed to come out in front of the two suspects. When he approached, Bright called out to them to see if they were armed and the reply was: "Yes, you gringo Son of a Bitch, I have a gun!" The bandits then opened fire and a gunfight ensued. Bright was wounded in one of his legs, but, just before taking cover behind a mound of dirt, he fired five shots in return. A few minutes later, Bright made good on his escape by crawling back to Leadville Canyon, which was later found to have been unnecessary. When a posse investigated the scene of the shootout later that day, they found that all five of Bright's bullets had been effective. Both of the Mexicans had been hit between the waist and the shoulders.

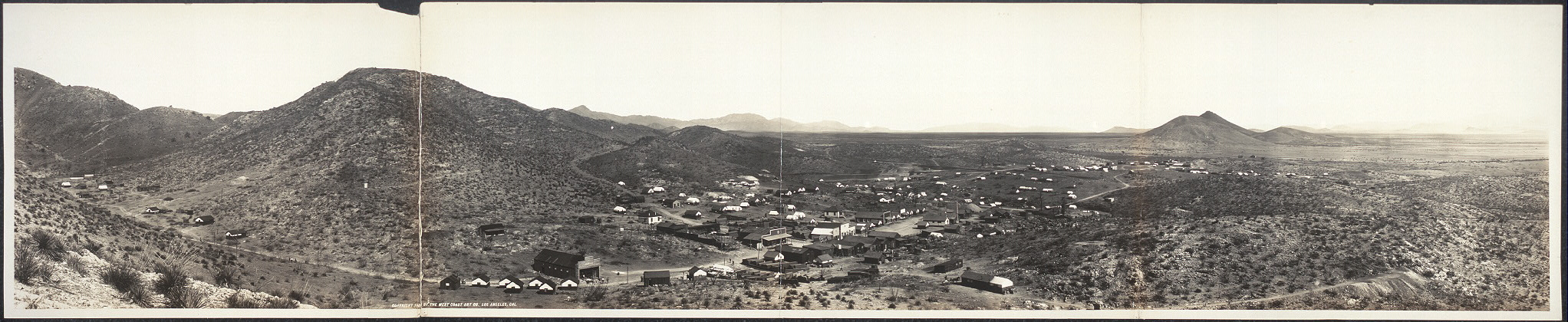
A panorama of Courtland in 1909, facing east.

== See also ==
- Cochise County in the Old West
