= Shootout at Wilson Ranch =

Shootout in Arizona on April 7, 1899

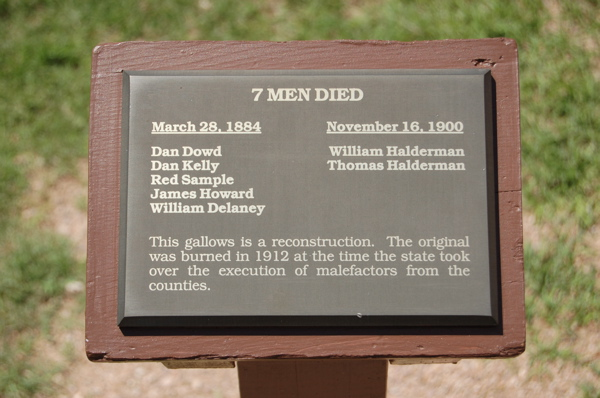
- A plaque at the Tombstone Courthouse State Historic Park listing the names of the men legally hanged in Tombstone.
- Date: April 7, 1899
- Location: Near Pearce, Arizona Territory, United States
- Deaths: 2

The Shootout at Wilson Ranch resulted in the final and most famous hanging in the history of Tombstone, Arizona. On April 7, 1899, the brothers William and Thomas Lee Halderman were confronted by two lawmen at a ranch located in the Chiricahua Mountains. A brief gunfight ensued, during which Constable Chester L. Ainsworth was killed and his deputy, Teddy Moore, was mortally wounded. The Halderman brothers then fled to New Mexico, but they were captured shortly thereafter and executed on November 16, 1900, following a hasty trial in Tombstone.

== Background ==
William and Thomas Halderman were twenty-one and eighteen, respectively, at the time of their deaths. They belonged to a wealthy and influential family of Texas pioneers, the Kokernots, but worked as cowboys in Cochise County, Arizona. In 1898, the Halderman brothers began feuding with the eighteen-year-old Teddy Moore over a pair of young women named Rena and Mary Wilson. According to later court findings, in November 1898, Moore threatened to kill William and continued to do so over the following months. Finally, on April 6, 1899, Justice William Monmonier received a report from the owner of the Smith Ranch, Buck Smith, accusing the Halderman brothers of stealing and killing cattle. A warrant was issued and the task of arresting the Haldermans fell onto Constable Chester Ainsworth, who was the brother of Attorney General Charles F. Ainsworth.

Because the Chiricahua Mountains were both wild and remote in 1899, Constable Ainsworth first went from his office in Pearce to the Smith Ranch to ask one of the ranchers there if he would assist in apprehending the Haldermans. However, according to R. Michael Wilson, Mr. Smith refused to help and told the constable to continue on to the Moore Ranch house, less than a mile away, to enlist the help of Teddy Moore. Ainsworth did just that and after deputizing Moore the two-man posse headed to the Halderman Ranch, which was located a short distance away, along Turkey Creek Canyon. After finding the house empty, Ainsworth decided to check Wilson Ranch, which was owned by John W. Wilson, who lived there with his sons, Johnny and Tol, and his two daughters, Rena and Mary.

== Shootout ==
Constable Ainsworth and Teddy Moore arrived at the Wilson Ranch house on the morning of April 7, 1899, sometime after dawn, but before noon. The two lawmen were side by side and approximately forty feet from the front porch of the house when Ainsworth read the arrest warrant aloud and demanded that the Halderman brothers come out peaceably. When it seemed as though the two young men were going to surrender without resisting, Ainsworth suggested that they eat breakfast before leaving and pack some of their belongings for staying a few days in Pearce. However, while inside the house, the Haldermans decided that Moore intended to do them harm, rather than take them to jail, so they armed themselves and reappeared at the two front doors of the house, which were located at each end of the porch.

The Haldermans had only one rifle of their own and William armed himself with it while his brother took Mr. Wilson's rifle. According to the Haldermans, as soon as they were seen with weapons in hand, the lawmen drew their side arms and began shooting into the house. William responded by firing back and after emptying his weapon he ran across the porch to his shocked brother to take up his rifle and continue shooting at Moore. Unfortunately, however, it was during this time that Ainsworth was shot off his horse and killed, having been struck in the heart. William later claimed that the death of Ainsworth was an accident and even said that he might have been killed by Moore. After Ainsworth fell, Moore turned his horse around and started riding away from the house as fast as he could. At about 150 yards away, William fired again and struck Moore in the bowels with a single bullet, but the latter was able to make it back to the Moore Ranch, where he bled to death in his mother's arms a few hours later.

Sometime before his death, Moore was able to tell his family what had happened. He said that it was the Haldermans who fired first and, initially, the Wilson sisters substantiated the claim because their father, in fear of what his neighbors would do if the brothers were released, threatened to punish them if they did otherwise. It was only after the Haldermans were sentenced to death that the Wilson sisters finally came forward and told the truth about what they had witnessed. It made no difference though.

The following appeared in the Pacific Reporter, Volume 60:

It appears from the record that on April 6, 1899, a complaint was lodged before W. [William] M. Monmonier, a justice of the peace for the precinct of Pearce, Cochise county, charging the Haldermans with having unlawfully killed cattle. A warrant was issued by the justice upon this complaint, and placed in the hands of one C. [Chester] L. Ainsworth, constable of the precinct, and a deputy sheriff [Teddy Moore] of the county.... They then went to the house of a neighbor by the name of [John W.] Wilson, where they found the defendants. Ainsworth and Moore rode to the front of the Wilson house, dismounted from their horses, and called the Haldermans out, whereupon Ainsworth read his warrant of arrest to them. Both Haldermans expressed a willingness to go with the officer, but before starting, upon suggestion of the latter [Ainsworth], went into the house to get their breakfast. While they were inside, Ainsworth called to them, and told them, as they might be detained at Pierce [Pearce] for two or three days, to take with them such articles of wearing apparel [clothing] as they might need. Soon after, the Haldermans appeared, one at each of the two front doors of the house, armed with rifles, and at once opened fire, instantly killing Ainsworth, and mortally wounding Moore. As to the facts above stated, there is no substantial conflict in the evidence. The testimony of the witness for the prosecution, supported by the dying declaration of Moore, as to the circumstances of the shooting, is to the effect that at the time the Haldermans appeared at the doors, Ainsworth and Moore were both mounted, and a short distance from the house; that the Haldermans, as soon as they appeared, called to Ainsworth and Moore to hold up their hands, but without waiting, at once fired; that Ainsworth immediately fell from his horse, shot through the heart; that Moore turned his horse, and started off, but was shot through the bowels as he rode away; that after the shooting the Haldermans immediately fled. The story, as told by the defendants, was that between themselves and Moore had existed a deadly enmity; that, after the warrant had been read, they asked the constable how they were to be taken to Pierce; that they were then told that they would have to walk down to a neighboring ranch, where there was a conveyance of some sort; that; fearing that Moore might on some pretext seek occasion on the way down to the ranch to do them [the Halderman brothers] harm, they concluded while in the house to take their rifles with them; that, as soon as they appeared at the front of the house, Moore pulled his gun and fired; that William Halderman at once returned the fire, and continued shooting until he had emptied his gun, and, as Moore continued to shoot, he then ran to the other door, where his brother Thomas Halderman stood, and, seizing the latter's gun, fired again at Moore, but by accident killed Ainsworth; that, fearing [lynch] mob violence at the hands of the friends of Ainsworth, the two then left the country [county]. (sic)

== Aftermath ==
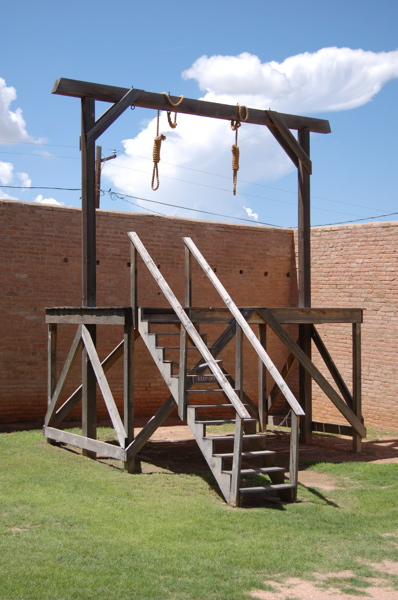
A replica of the gallows that were used for the hanging of the Halderman brothers on display at the Tombstone Courthouse State Historic Park.

On the day after the shooting, the sheriff of Cochise County, Scott White, offered a $50 reward for the arrest of the Haldermans and a reward poster began circulating. Despite the small reward, the Haldermans were captured by Deputy Sid Mullen on April 12, while they were camped just across the border of New Mexico, east of Duncan.

The Haldermans were first held in the jail at Pearce, and were later transferred to Tombstone for their trial. Early in the month of June, the court found the Haldermans guilty, convicted them of first-degree murder on June 11, and sentenced them to hang on August 10, 1900. Meanwhile, the Haldermans' family was trying its best to influence the court's decision in order "to prevent a stain on the name of one of the best pioneer families of Texas." All they were able to achieve was a delay of the eventual execution. During that time, the Haldermans attempted to gather evidence which supported their claims that the allegations of cattle rustling were false and that the shootout was the result of a feud, rather than petty theft. The Haldermans claimed that Moore was responsible for the stolen cattle and that he was trying to frame them so he could then be free to woo Rena Wilson. The Haldermans sent in an appeal and because Governor Nathan O. Murphy was out of state the application was sent to President William McKinley, who granted them a stay of execution until October 5, 1900, so they could gather more evidence for their defense. When he returned, Governor Murphy extended the stay, but the Haldermans' evidence did not materialize and the date of execution was set for November 16, 1900. The Kokernot-Halderman family claimed that the trial was unfair, being that the prosecutor was none other than Attorney General Charles L. Ainsworth, Chester Ainsworth's brother, and that the jury was "eager for a hanging."

The execution was carried out on November 16, as previously arranged. A large crowd gathered to witness the hanging, although only 100 invitations were given out. The rest of the onlookers watched from the windows of the Old Cochise County Courthouse. Both of the Haldermans were reported as having met their end bravely. When Thomas Halderman appeared from the jail, he said: "Hello, Hombres.... The Sun's hot, ain't it?" After climbing up the scaffold, William said: "Nice looking crowd.... Some of you fellers are shaking already." Then, as he turned to his brother, William said: "Those people look alright." A moment later, Thomas placed a noose around his own neck while Sheriff White read the death warrant and his brother talked with a deputy named Bravin. When he was finished, Sheriff White asked the Haldermans if they wanted to say any last words. William responded: "I have nothing to say and guess it would not do any good anyway. I forgive you all and hope you will forgive me." William then requested time for a prayer so Reverend Alexander Elliott stepped forward to assist. Black masks were then lowered over the Haldermans' heads and in chorus they said: "Good-bye boys! Pray for us." The trap door underneath the Haldermans feet was opened at exactly 12:40 P.M. Thirteen minutes later, Thomas was pronounced dead and William two minutes after. The doctors at the scene reported that Thomas had died of a broken neck, but William's death was caused by "the violent shock, compression of a vital nerve, and by strangulation."

The Halderman brothers became the last criminals to be buried in Tombstone's Boothill Graveyard and their graves can still be visited today. The Old Cochise County Courthouse has also been restored so that it appears as it did in 1900, during the Haldermans' trial.

As for the Wilson family, Rena later committed suicide for her involvement in the case and in 1913 Mary was put in an insane asylum by her brother, Tol, who was killed shortly thereafter in what became known as the Cottonwood Canyon Murder.

== See also ==
- List of Old West gunfights
- Cochise County in the Old West
