= Burton C. Mossman =

American sheriff (1867–1956)

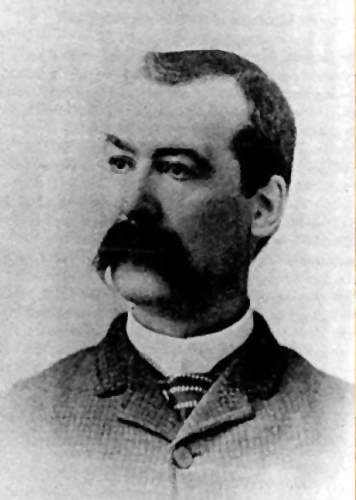
- Born: April 30, 1867; Near Aurora, Illinois
- Died: September 5, 1956 (aged 89); Diamond A Ranch (Roswell, New Mexico)

Burton C. Mossman (April 30, 1867 – September 5, 1956) was an American lawman and cattleman in the final years of the Old West. He is most remembered for his capture of the notorious border bandit Augustine Chacon in 1902, though he was also a successful businessman who owned the large Diamond A Ranch in New Mexico.

== Biography ==
Burton C. Mossman was born on April 30, 1867, at farmhouse near Aurora, Illinois. In 1873, he and his family moved to Missouri and in 1882 they moved again, this time to New Mexico. Sometime after 1884, Mossman became a cowboy employed by the Hashknife Outfit, a large cattle company in northern Arizona Territory. Mossman was somewhat popular and respected. By the age of twenty he was the ranch foreman and in 1897 he was promoted to superintendent. During this time, Mossman was occupied with fighting cattle rustlers or pursuing private business ventures. Aside from ranching, Mossman and a partner operated a stagecoach line and in 1898 he was elected sheriff of Navajo County. That same year, Mossman and three of his associates built a brick opera house in Winslow, but he soon sold his share and built a store in Douglas, which was later sold as well, for $13,000. Mossman is said to have joined Theodore Roosevelt's Rough Riders in 1898 and fought in the Spanish–American War; however, author Bill O'Neal makes no mention of this in his Encyclopedia of Western Gunfighters and it seems Mossman was already very busy managing the Hashknife Outfit, serving as sheriff, and pursuing personal business interests. By 1901, banditry was widespread in Arizona so the territorial governor, Oakes Murphy, authorized the re-establishment of the Arizona Rangers. Because of his popularity, as well as past exploits, Mossman was appointed to be the first captain of the new unit.

=== Shootings ===
Mossman was involved in at least five shootings during his time as a rancher or a lawman. The first recorded in Bill O'Neal's Encyclopedia of Western Gunfighters occurred in the summer of 1896. By this time, the Aztec Land & Cattle Company was in trouble so Mossman drove a herd of cattle south to Mazatlan, in Sinaloa, Mexico, to sell it. While in a Mazatlan cantina, Mossman quarrelled with a Mexican Army captain, who challenged him to a pistol duel. Mossman accepted and on the following morning the two men met, loaded their weapons with a single bullet, and then took fifteen steps away from each other. The captain was armed with a semi auto pistol identified as a Luger (unlikely) and Mossman had a short-barrelled Colt .45. When the two men turned around, both fired their weapons at the same time. The captain's shot missed, but Mossman managed to strike his opponent's shoulders. Mossman spent the next month in a Mexican jail, until he made his escape with the help of a friend.

On March 17, 1898, after becoming sheriff of Navajo County, Mossman was out searching for a gang of cattle rustlers with Deputy Sheriff Joe Bargeman and a treacherous Mexican guide. In Walter Canyon, the posse found a cabin and a slaughtered cow, at which time the guide tried to make a run for it with his horse. Mossman chased the man down and knocked him off his horse with his Winchester rifle. Then, as he dismounted to help the guide to his feet, three other Mexican men opened fire on Mossman from 100 yards away. One bullet grazed Mossman's nose, one knocked off his saddle horn, and a final bullet cut his reins. Deputy Bareman had opened up by this time and, with covering fire, Mossman was able to take the guide prisoner and bring him to the cabin. The outlaws briefly laid siege to the cabin, but they soon retreated and the policemen made it to Holbrook, sixty miles away.

Mossman was involved in another shooting that year. One fall night, Mossman was undressing in the second-floor room of a hotel in Springer, New Mexico when a bullet came up through the floor near his chair. Then, as he began rolling up his mattress for protection, a second shot came in. Angrily, Mossman armed himself with his rifle and began firing through the floor and into the bar below. According to O'Neal, the bar was vacated immediately and nobody was harmed. A bullet did, however, put a hole through the brim of a man's hat and a second one smashed a glass out of another man's hand.

Mossman fought in two more skirmishes in 1901, after becoming the captain of the Arizona Rangers. The first occurred in Paradise Valley. Mossman was pursuing an outlaw named Salivaras and the trail led him to a water hole somewhere in the valley. As Mossman approached, Salivaras lay in ambush and grazed the captain in his right leg. Mossman immediately identified where the shot had come from so he then quickly pulled up his rifle, fired a single shot, and jumped off his horse. Sometime later, after working his way up to Salivaras' position, Mossman discovered that his bullet had taken off the top of the outlaw's head.

Later that year, Mossman received information that six suspected train robbers were held up twenty miles south of the international border, along the Colorado River in Sonora. According to Bill O'Neal, Mossman and three of his men found the outlaws in an adobe house and then proceeded to destroy it with dynamite. After exploding four sticks, the outlaws attempted to shoot their way out, but the rangers shot five of them down with rifle fire. A sixth man escaped on horseback and none of the rangers were hurt.

=== Augustine Chacon ===
In 1902, Mossman turned his attention to apprehending the border bandit Augustine Chacon. To do this, Mossman came up with an idea that involved posing as an outlaw and recruiting the train robber Burt Alvord, who was a friend of Chacon, to use him as a stool pigeon. However, to recruit Alvord, Mossman had to find his hideout in Sonora, where he would be totally helpless against both the bandits and Mexican authorities. Mossman had previously attempted to capture Alvord and his gang, but they got away. This time, Mossman hoped that Alvord would be willing to help him with Chacon and then surrender in exchange for a lighter sentence and the reward money offered for Chacon's head. On April 22, 1902, after traveling for several days by wagon and on horseback, Mossman discovered Alvord's hideout, a small hut located some distance away from San Jose de Pima. The captain approached the hut unarmed and by chance he found Alvord standing alone outside while the rest of the gang were playing cards inside. Mossman was first to introduce himself and though Alvord was immediately alarmed about the presence of a police officer at his hideout, he agreed to feed Mossman and listen to what he had to say. When it was obvious that Mossman was not trying to fool Alvord, the two men agreed to cooperate and that Billy Stiles would act as their messenger for it would take a while for Alvord to find Chacon and convince him to cross the Arizona border and somebody had to warn the captain of when the bandits arrived. When he did finally catch up with Chacon, over three months later, Alvord first had to go with him to the Yaqui River, to sell some stolen horses, before going back to the border. As the bandits were nearing the rendezvous, Alvord sent Stiles ahead to tell Mossman to meet them just south of the border, at the Socorro Mountain Springs, in Sonora.

Mossman and Stiles failed to meet Alvord and Chacon in the Socorro Mountains, but, on the following night, they found the bandits at the home of Alvord's wife. There, after exchanging names, Mossman and the others agreed to cross the border back into Arizona on the next day, so they could steal some horses from Greene's Ranch that night. However, it was decided that it was too dark for stealing horses that night and the party went back to their camp, which was located less than seven miles north of the border. According to Raine, just before daybreak, on September 4, 1902, Alvord was preparing to leave when he "tiptoed" over to Mossman and said: "I brought Chacon to you, but you don't seem able to take him. I've done my share and I don't want him to suspect me. Remember that if you take him you have promised that the reward shall go to me, and that you'll stand by me at my trial if I surrender. You sure want to be mighty careful, or he'll kill you. So long." When Chacon awoke later that morning, his suspicions were aroused when he found that Alvord was no longer in camp. After breakfast, Stiles suggested that they go steal the horses in daylight, but Chacon was uninterested and said he was going back to Sonora. Mossman knew his time to act was now. Chacon and Stiles were sitting on the ground next to each other when Mossman stood up. First he asked for and received a cigarette from Chacon, then, as he dropped the twig he used to light his cigarette, Mossman pulled out his revolver and aimed it at Chacon. According to author William McLeod Raine, Mossman said: "Hands up, Chacon," to which the bandit said: "Is this a joke?" Mossman replied: "No. Throw your hands up or you're a dead man." Chacon then said: "I don't see as it makes any difference after he is dead whether a man's hands are up or down. You're going to kill me anyway, why don't you shoot?" Mossman had Stiles disarm Chacon and then put him on a horse for the journey to the railroad, where they boarded a train to Benson. Of note is that several times Chacon attempted to escape by throwing himself off his horse, presumably at a place where Mossman could not easily follow, such as a steep hillside or something similar. The capture of Chacon was anticlimactic but Mossman's plan worked exactly as he hoped. Chacon was eventually hanged in Solomonville on November 21, 1902.

=== Later life and death ===
After the capture of Augustine Chacon, Mossman resigned from his position in July 1902 to focus on a peaceful life as a businessman in Bisbee, although rumors circulated that he was uninterested in working for the new governor, L. C. Hughes. Mossman later returned to the cattle business and purchased the Diamond A Ranch, near Roswell, New Mexico, where he died of old age on September 5, 1956. Mossman was buried at the Mount Washington Cemetery in Independence, Missouri and the Diamond A Ranch is now listed on the National Register of Historic Places.

According to historian David Leighton, of the Arizona Daily Star newspaper, Mossman Road in Tucson, Arizona, is named in honor of Burton C. Mossman.

In 1960, he was inducted into the Hall of Great Westerners of the National Cowboy & Western Heritage Museum.

Arizona Rangers founded	Captain of the Arizona Rangers; 1901–1902	Succeeded by Thomas H. Rynning
