= Thomas H. Rynning =

American soldier and lawman (1866–1941)

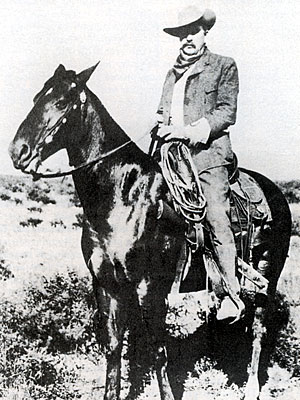
- Born: February 17, 1866; Christiania, Norway
- Died: June 18, 1941 (aged 75); San Diego, California
- Burial place: Fort Rosecrans National Cemetery
- Military career
- Allegiance: United States of America
- Branch: United States Army
- Rank: Second Lieutenant
- Conflicts: Apache Wars: Geronimo's War; Sioux Wars: Ghost Dance War; Spanish–American War: Battle of Las Guasimas; Battle of San Juan Hill; Siege of Santiago
- Other work: Arizona Ranger, Prison warden, United States Marshal

Thomas Harbo Rynning (February 17, 1866 – June 18, 1941) was an officer in the United States Army who served with Theodore Roosevelt's Rough Riders during the Spanish–American War. He was also the captain of the Arizona Rangers, warden of Yuma Territorial Prison, and a United States Marshal in San Diego, California.

== Early life and military career ==
=== American Indian Wars ===
Thomas Rynning was born in Christiania, Norway on February 17, 1866. At the age of two, his parents emigrated to the United States and settled in Beloit, Wisconsin. By 1885, Rynning was in Texas when he decided to enlist in the United States Army's 8th Cavalry Regiment. His first battle was against the Cheyenne while serving under General Philip Sheridan. After the Cheyenne were defeated, he was transferred with his regiment to Arizona Territory. Under Lieutenant Samuel Fountain, Rynning engaged in Geronimo's War and was present when Geronimo was captured by Leonard Wood. In 1888, Rynning participated in the Great March, the longest cavalry ride in American history, from Arizona Territory to Dakota Territory. In Dakota, the 8th Cavalry relieved the 7th Cavalry and eventually went on to fight in the Ghost Dance War against Chief Sitting Bull. Rynning was honorably discharged in 1891 with a record of seventeen battles against natives. He then went to California, but, two years later, he settled in Tucson, Arizona, where he became a successful building contractor.

=== Spanish–American War ===
In 1898, Rynning discovered that the war with Spain had begun and that his old friend, Colonel Leonard Wood, was raising a volunteer cavalry regiment, which later became known as Theodore Roosevelt's Rough Riders. He enlisted as a private and returned from the war a second lieutenant in Troop B, 1st United States Volunteer Cavalry Regiment. During the Battle of San Juan Heights, Rynning took command of the American line following the death of Captain Buckey O'Neill. A few minutes later he led the Rough Riders up Kettle Hill and was the first American to reach the summit. Under heavy fire from the nearby San Juan Hill, Rynning ordered his men to wave the regiment's flag to rally the others and it was during this time that the flag was badly holed. The flag is now preserved by the Department of Library and Archives in the state capitol building in Phoenix, Arizona. After that, Rynning joined Theodore Roosevelt in the charge up San Juan Hill, which ended the battle with an American victory.

== Later life and death ==
=== Arizona Rangers ===
After returning from Cuba, Rynning went back to Arizona and continued working as a contractor. However, in 1902, his friend and fellow Rough Rider, Alexander Oswald Brodie, was elected governor of Arizona and one of his first appointments was making Rynning the new captain of the Arizona Rangers. Rynning was living in Douglas at that time so, after becoming captain, he moved his headquarters there from Bisbee. In 1903, Rynning played an important role in helping keep the peace during the Clifton and Morenci riots. In 1906, Rynning commanded a large posse of American militia that assisted Colonel Emilio Kosterlitsky in quelling the riot at Cananea, Sonora. In June, authorities received a telegram from mine owner William D. Greene reporting that American citizens were being attacked by rioting caused by a strike among the workers at the Cananea Consolidated Copper Company. A volunteer force of 275 armed men was quickly organized and Rynning, with five rangers and seventy others armed with rifles, boarded a train at Naco and entered Sonora with orders to suppress the rioting and protect American lives and property. Although Governor Rafael Izabal was alerted to the possibility of the escalation of the conflict between the Arizona Rangers and the largely unarmed strikers, the governor simply refused to intervene commenting that the men were "on their own". The fighting had long since ended as a truce had been agreed by the strikers and local officials by the time of Rynning's arrival. Placed between the strikers and the office buildings of the Cananea Company, Rynning's men guarded the property during negotiations until asked to leave by Mexican officials several hours later.

On September 4, 1906, Rynning led Arizona Rangers and immigration officers in a raid on an underground cell of the Partido Liberal Mexicano during a meeting in Douglas. Discovering dynamite, pistols and banners, seven members were arrested for violation of the Neutrality Law. The group had been gathering weapons and ammunition for a major expedition into Mexico which included capturing custom houses on the border, blowing up railways, cutting telegraph wires and raiding stores for weapons and supplies. The Douglas group had also commissioned Javier Huitemea to negotiate with the Yaqui to support them, promising the tribe the return of the land which had been taken from them. Extensive evidence of correspondence with Saint Louis Junta provided American authorities with evidence of other groups operating in Mowry and Patagonia.

=== Yuma Territorial Prison and Florence State Prison ===
Resigning his position with the Arizona Rangers in March 1907, he was appointed superintendent of the Yuma Territorial Prison in Yuma by President William Howard Taft. He then immediately began the process of abandoning the old prison complex and building a new one in Florence. Rynning supervised the construction and brought convicts from Yuma to help with the work. When Arizona became a state in 1912, a Democratic government under George W. P. Hunt took over and removed Rynning from his post. However, after Thomas Edward Campbell was elected, Rynning was again appointed superintendent of the prison in 1921.

=== Death ===
In his later life, Rynning moved to San Diego, California, where he received a commission as a deputy marshal in 1934. He also served as an undersheriff there. Rynning died in San Diego on June 18, 1941, at the age of seventy-five, and was buried at Fort Rosecrans National Cemetery.

== In popular culture ==
- Rynning was portrayed by Tristram Coffin (1909–1990) in the 1957–1959 syndicated television series 26 Men. Kelo Henderson co-starred as Deputy Clint Travis.

He wrote a book with Al Cohn and Joe Chisholm called “Gun Notches” a saga of his life.

== See also ==
- Tiburon Island Tragedy
- Shootout in Benson
- Arizona State Prison Complex – Florence

Preceded by Burton C. Mossman	Captain of the Arizona Rangers; 1902–1907	Succeeded by Harry C. Wheeler
