= List of Old West gunfights =

This is a list of Old West gunfights. Gunfights have left a lasting impression on American frontier history; many were retold and embellished by dime novels and magazines like Harper's Weekly during the late 19th and early 20th century. The most notable shootouts took place in Arizona, California, New Mexico, Kansas, Oklahoma, and Texas. Some like the Gunfight at the O.K. Corral were the outcome of long-simmering feuds and rivalries but most were the result of a confrontation between outlaws and law enforcement.

== List ==
- Bellevue War, April 1, 1840, Bellevue, Iowa Territory,
- Broderick–Terry duel, September 13, 1859, San Francisco, California
- Wild Bill Hickok–Davis Tutt shootout, July 21, 1865, Springfield, Missouri
- Gunfight at Hide Park, August 19, 1871, Newton, Kansas
- Goingsnake massacre, April 15, 1872, Tahlequah, Indian Territory
- Lampasas Gunfight, June 7, 1877, Lampasas, Texas
- Battle of Blazer's Mill, April 4, 1878, Mescalero, New Mexico Territory
- Battle of Lincoln, July 15–19, 1878, Lincoln, New Mexico Territory
- Long Branch Saloon Gunfight, April 5, 1879, Dodge City, Kansas
- Variety Hall Shootout, January 22, 1880, Las Vegas, New Mexico Territory
- Mussel Slough Tragedy, May 11, 1880, Hanford, California
- Luke Short-Charlie Storms Gunfight, February 25, 1881, Tombstone, Arizona Territory
- Four Dead in Five Seconds Gunfight, April 14, 1881, El Paso, Texas
- Gunfight at the O.K. Corral, October 26, 1881, Tombstone, Arizona Territory
- Trinidad Gunfight, April 16, 1882, Trinidad, Colorado
- Vaudeville Theater Ambush, March 11, 1884, San Antonio, Texas
- Hunnewell gunfight, August 21, 1884, Hunnewell, Kansas
- Frisco shootout, December 1, 1884, Reserve, New Mexico Territory
- Tascosa Gunfight, March 21, 1886, Tascosa, Texas
- Election Riot of 1886, April 6, 1886, Laredo, Texas
- Luke Short-Jim Courtright Gunfight, February 8, 1887, Fort Worth, Texas
- Tewksbury's Ranch shootout, September 1887, Pleasant Valley, Arizona Territory
- Owens-Blevins Shootout, September 1887, Holbrook, Arizona Territory
- Tunnel Saloon Gabriel-Phy shootout, May 31, 1888, Florence, Arizona
- Battle of Cimarron, January 12, 1889, Cimarron, Kansas
- Wham Paymaster robbery, May 11, 1889, near Fort Thomas, Arizona Territory
- Battle of Coffeyville, October 5, 1892, Coffeyville, Kansas
- Battle of Stone Corral, June 11–12, 1893, Visalia, California
- Battle of Tres Jacales, June 30, 1893, Tres Jacales, Chihuahua
- Battle of Ingalls, September 1, 1893, Ingalls, Indian Territory
- Gunfight at Morenci, December 18, 1895, Morenci, Arizona Territory
- Skeleton Canyon shootout, August 12, 1896, Nogales, Arizona Territory
- Blackwell gunfight, December 4, 1896, Blackwell, Indian Territory
- Shootout on Juneau Wharf, July 8, 1898, Skagway, District of Alaska
- Hot Springs Gunfight, March 16, 1899, Hot Springs, Arkansas
- Columbus shootout, March 16, 1899, Columbus, Texas
- Shootout at Wilson Ranch, April 7, 1899, Pearce, Arizona Territory
- Fairbank train robbery, February 15, 1900, Fairbank, Arizona Territory
- Moab Shootout, May 26, 1900, Moab, Utah
- Battleground Gunfight, October 8, 1901, Fort Apache Indian Reservation, Arizona Territory
- Gunfight at Spokogee, September 22, 1902, Dustin, Indian Territory
- Canyon Diablo Shootout, April 8, 1905, Canyon Diablo, Arizona Territory
- Shootout in Benson, February 27, 1907, Benson, Arizona Territory
- Naco Gunfight, April 5, 1908, Naco, Sonora
- Shootout at Sonoratown, May 15, 1911, near Ray, Arizona Territory
- Gleeson Gunfight, March 5, 1917, Gleeson, Arizona
- Power's Cabin Shootout, February 10, 1918, Galiuro Mountains, Arizona

== See also ==
- List of cowboys and cowgirls
- List of Western lawmen
- List of Old West gunfighters
