= Gleeson gunfight =

1917 Old West gunfight in Cochise County, Arizona

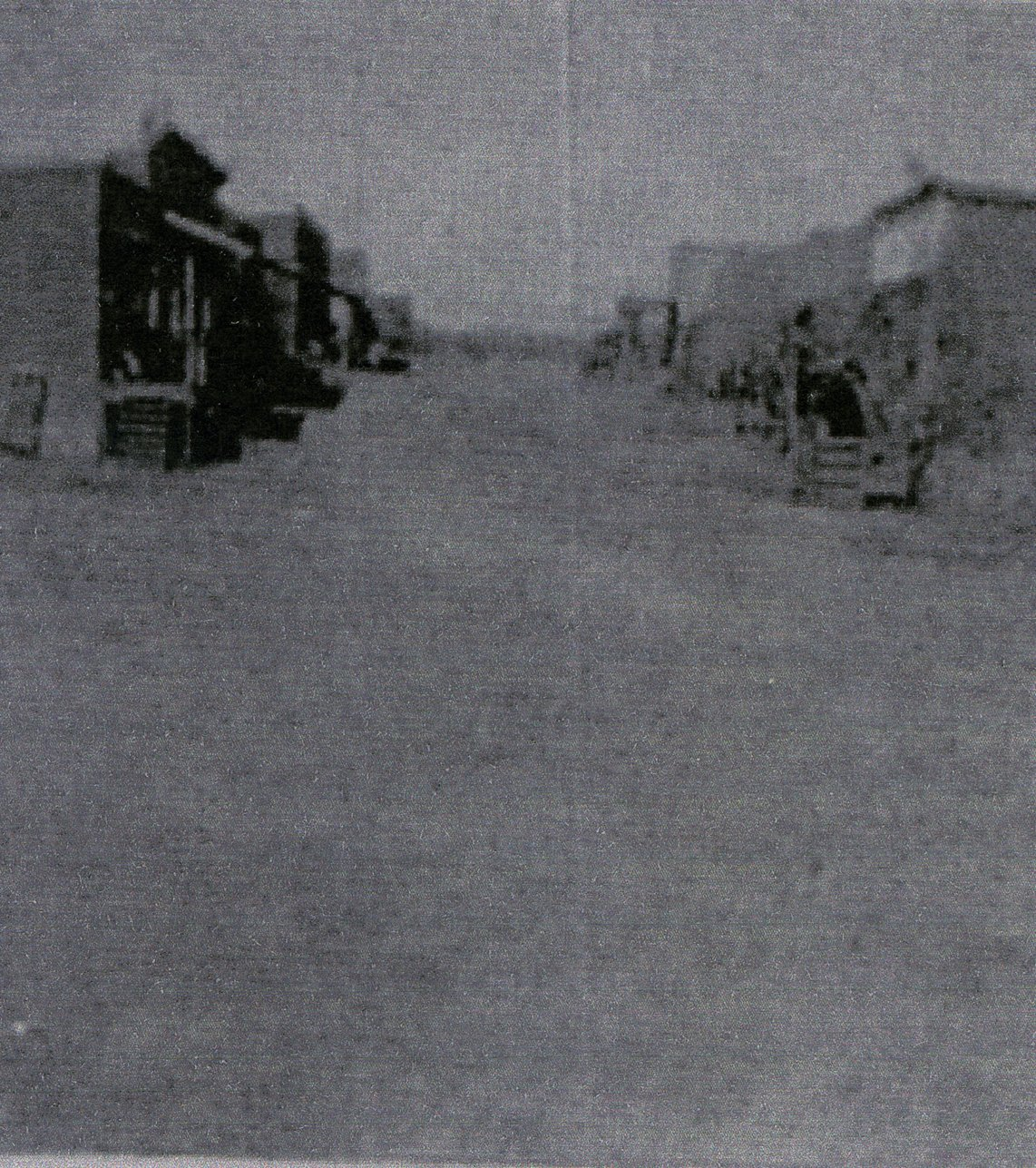
- Gleeson in 1917
- Date: March 5, 1917
- Location: Near Gleeson, Arizona, United States
- Also known as: Gleeson shootout
- Participants: Harry C. Wheeler
- Outcome: ~1 wounded

The Gleeson gunfight, or the Gleeson shootout, was one of the last gunfights in the Old West, having occurred during the transition period between the "Old" and the "New." On March 5, 1917, the sheriff of Cochise County, Harry C. Wheeler, and his deputy, Lafe Gibson, were ambushed by a gang of Mexican alcohol smugglers near the town of Gleeson, Arizona. During the battle that followed, Wheeler and Gibson fought off the attackers and confiscated their alcohol, wounding at least one man in the process.

== Gunfight ==
At the turn of the century, smuggling across the international border with Mexico was a serious problem. Arizona became a "dry" state with the banning of alcohol on January 1, 1915. But because Cochise County was bordered by "wet" Mexico and New Mexico, it quickly became a conduit for both American and Mexican alcohol smugglers.

Harry Wheeler, a former Captain of the Arizona Rangers and the Sheriff of Cochise County was an enthusiastic enforcer of the state's ban on the sale and manufacture of liquor. Throughout his tenure in office, Wheeler and his deputies arrested dozens of violators and routinely patrolled the border with New Mexico and the International Boundary with Mexico for smugglers. Several of Wheeler's deputies engaged bootleggers in shootouts throughout Cochise County.

On the night of March 5, 1917, Sheriff Wheeler and Deputy Gibson were returning to the latter's home at Gleeson in an Oldsmobile Touring Car after a day of searching the Chiricahua Mountains for smugglers. But, because they were exhausted and could not safely drive in the dark, at sunset the two lawmen decided to stop and make camp for the night. The location was about two miles east of Gleeson, along the Southern Pacific Railroad tracks. However, not long after they had rolled out their blankets and laid down next to the car, a salvo of fire came in from some Mexican outlaws positioned behind some rocks about 200 yards away from the railroad tracks. The first shot smashed the front window out of the car.

Wheeler immediately grabbed a box of ammunition and his rifle to begin returning the fire while Gibson had only his revolver and the ammunition on his gun belt. After climbing up to the top of the railroad berm to get a look at their attackers, the two lawmen could hear the outlaws shouting insults to them in Spanish, saying: "We'll fix you gringos!" and "Come and get us now!" They were also able to determine that there were at least four attackers, by counting where the muzzle flashes were coming from.

For nearly an hour the two sides exchanged fire ineffectively; over 100 rounds of ammunition was expended. The Moon was behind the lawmen and low on the horizon, which made them easy targets, so they decided to lie prone and wait until the Moon went down to make a charge towards the outlaws. Meanwhile, the outlaws were advancing under covering fire. Finally, when they were about fifty yards from the railroad, one of the outlaws fired at Wheeler and just barely missed him. Wheeler, who was a champion marksman, then steadied his rifle on one of the rails and rapidly fired six shots at the Mexican's muzzle flash. A second later, Wheeler heard the sounds of groans so he knew he had hit his target.

Although the fighting continued, Wheeler's successful hit stopped the outlaws' advance and sent them back towards cover. Then, when the Moon disappeared below the horizon, the lawmen made their charge and found the outlaws' camp hastily abandoned, the Mexicans having slipped away into the desert. Ten cases of whiskey were found attached to four donkeys and, on the following morning, horse tracks were observed heading towards the Chiricahua Mountains. Wheeler also discovered a large pool of blood and tracks made by a man's knees and elbows. No body was found though so it remains uncertain if anyone was actually killed as result of the shootout.

== Aftermath ==
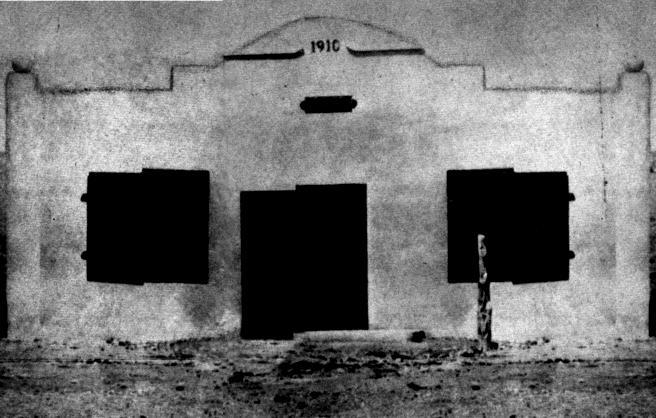
The Gleeson Jail upon completion in 1910.

Sheriff Wheeler and Deputy Gibson decided against chasing the outlaws right away, since their car was damaged by incoming fire. Instead they went to Courtland, where Wheeler telephoned his chief deputy, Guy Welch, who was in Tombstone. Welch then brought some more guns and ammunition to Courtland, as well as another deputy, to help in the pursuit.

Wheeler knew that since the outlaws were in the Chiricahuas and most-likely heading south to cross the border, they would have to go through Apache Pass in order to enter Mexico. Accordingly, Wheeler and his men abandoned the pursuit and went to Tombstone on April 7, 1917, to drop off the confiscated whiskey, and on the next day they went to Apache Pass and succeeded in capturing two of the outlaws, who were then put in the Gleeson Jail. One of the prisoners was the gang's leader, Santiago Garcia. When asked why he opened fire on Wheeler and Gibson, Garcia said that he thought the lawmen were rival bootleggers and he was afraid that his cargo would be hijacked. According to Garcia, he and his men retreated only when they found out that Wheeler and Gibson were lawmen.

Ultimately, Wheeler and his men failed to capture the remaining outlaws, who escaped into Mexico, and they were immediately tasked with investigating a murder in Douglas and the finding of a dead body near Bisbee, the latter having died from a gunshot to the head. The Gleeson gunfight was Wheeler's last, although he later resigned his post to join the United States Army and went on to fight in World War I. After returning, Wheeler attempted to get his old job back, but he was defeated in the election.

In 2008, the Gleeson Jail was purchased and restored by Tina Miller and John Wiest.

== See also ==
- List of Old West gunfights
- Cochise County in the Old West
