= Diamond A Ranch (Roswell, New Mexico) =

- U.S. National Register of Historic Places
- Location within New Mexico Location within the United States
- Location: About 14 miles (23 km) west of Roswell, New Mexico on U.S. Route 380, then about 2 miles (3.2 km) south on private ranch road
- Coordinates: 33°21′06″N 104°51′08″W
- Area: less than one acre
- Built: 1883
- MPS: Roswell New Mexico MRA
- NRHP reference No.: 85003635
- Added to NRHP: August 29, 1988

The Diamond A Ranch, near Roswell, New Mexico, is a historic ranch. A portion of the ranch less than one acre in size, including two contributing buildings dating from the late 1880s or early 1890s, was listed on the National Register of Historic Places in 1988.

The ranch headquarters is an L-shaped building constructed of 2 feet (0.61 m) thick walls. The bunkhouse is also built of stone; both have pitched metal roofs.
