= Gleeson, Arizona =

Town in Cochise County, Arizona, United States

- Ghost town
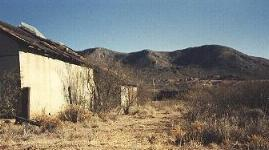
- Remains of Gleeson

- Location within Arizona Location within the United States
- Coordinates: 31°44′2″N 109°49′47″W
- Country: United States
- State: Arizona
- County: Cochise
- Founded: c.1875
- Named after: John Gleeson
- Elevation: 4,924 ft (1,501 m)

Population (2023)
  - Total: 0
- Time zone: UTC-7 (MST (no DST))
- Area code: 520
- Turquoise Post Office: October 22, 1890 – September 17, 1894
- Gleeson Post Office: October 15, 1900 – March 31, 1939
- FIPS code: 04-26700
- GNIS feature ID: 24427

Gleeson is a ghost town situated in southeastern Cochise County, Arizona, United States. It has an estimated elevation of 4,924 feet (1,501 m) above sea level. The town was first settled as Turquoise in the 1870s in what was then the Arizona Territory, then later re-established as Gleeson in 1900.

== History ==
The area was initially settled as a mining camp called Turquoise after the mineral which had been mined by Native Americans in the area. The Turquoise post office was established on October 22, 1890, and lasted only a few years until September 17, 1894. When local miner John Gleeson registered a copper claim and opened the Copper Belle Mine, the town of Gleeson was created just downhill from the old site of Turquoise. Silver Bill, Pejon and Defiance were some of the other mines that followed in the surrounding areas.

The Gleeson post office, established on October 15, 1900, supported a town of about 500 people engaged primarily in copper mining, including veins of lead, silver and zinc.

In 1912, 28 buildings burned to the ground and the town was rebuilt.

Copper production boomed to supply demand during World War I. The mines played out by the 1930s and eventually the Gleeson post office closed on March 31, 1939.

== Remnants ==
Though several families still live on the site, Gleeson is, by all measures, a ghost town, with the last commercial venture a rattlesnake products store that closed in 2014. Visitors can find the ruins of a hospital, a saloon, a cemetery, a jail, the foundation of the village school and evidence of the extensive mining in the surrounding hills near town. The Gleeson cemetery is west of the town on the road to Tombstone.

The Arizona Republic newspaper published an article on the town on January 12, 2014, stating that the jail has been renovated and now is a museum.

== Geography ==
Gleeson is located 16 miles (26 km) east of Tombstone on the southern slopes of the Dragoon Mountains It is located on the Ghost Town Trail near Courtland and Pearce.

== Gallery ==
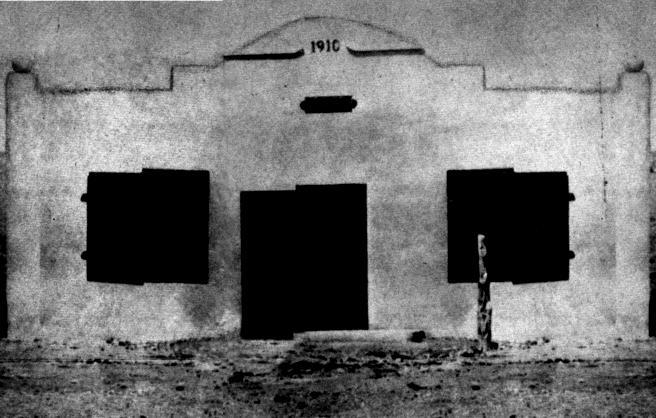
The Gleeson Jail upon completion in 1910.

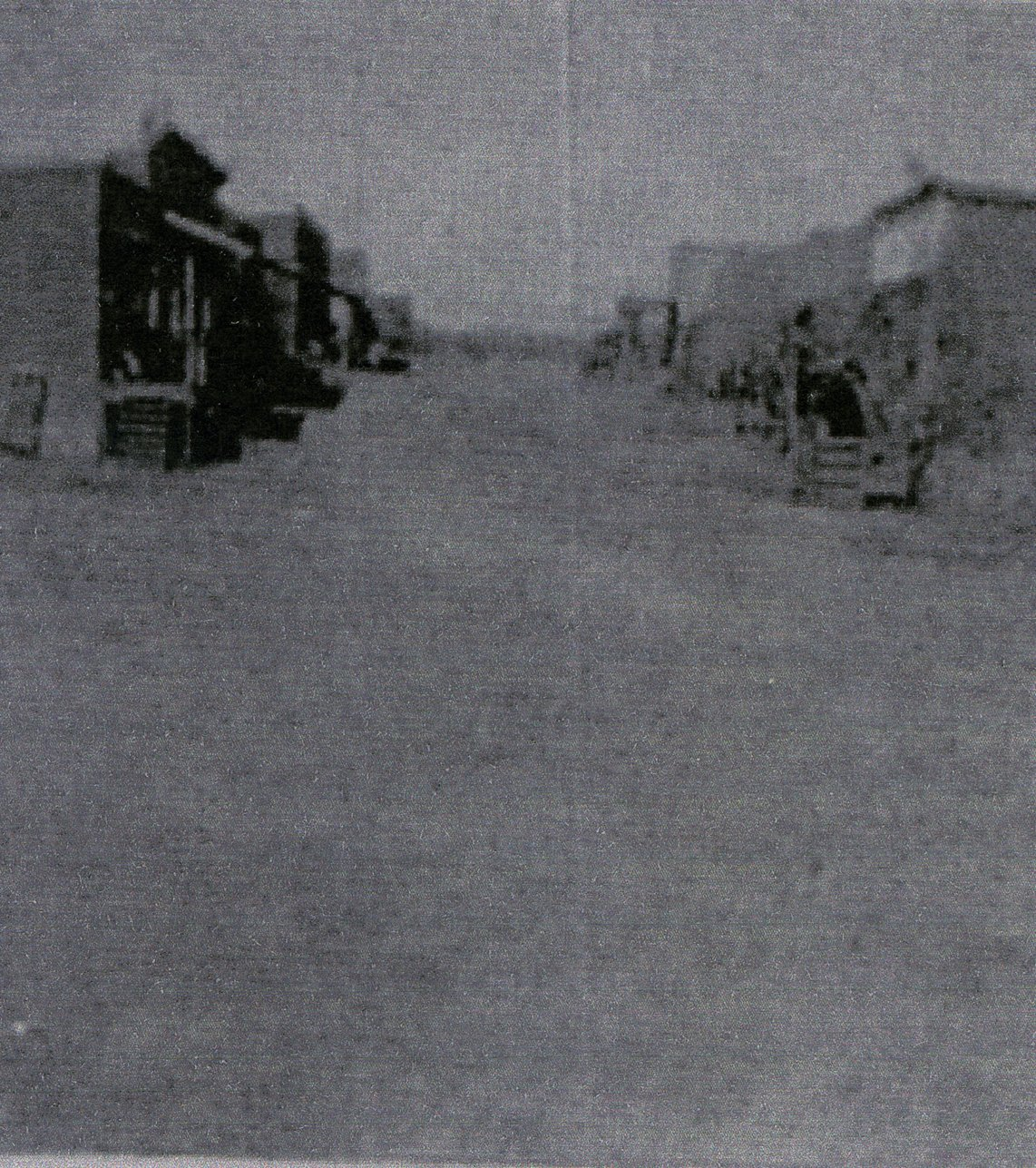
Gleeson's Main Street in 1917.

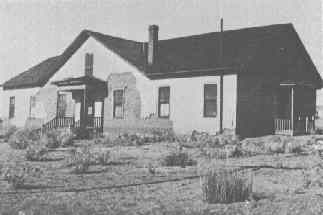
Gleeson's hospital in 1925.

== See also ==
- Gleeson Gunfight
