= Harry C. Wheeler =

American lawman (1875–1925)

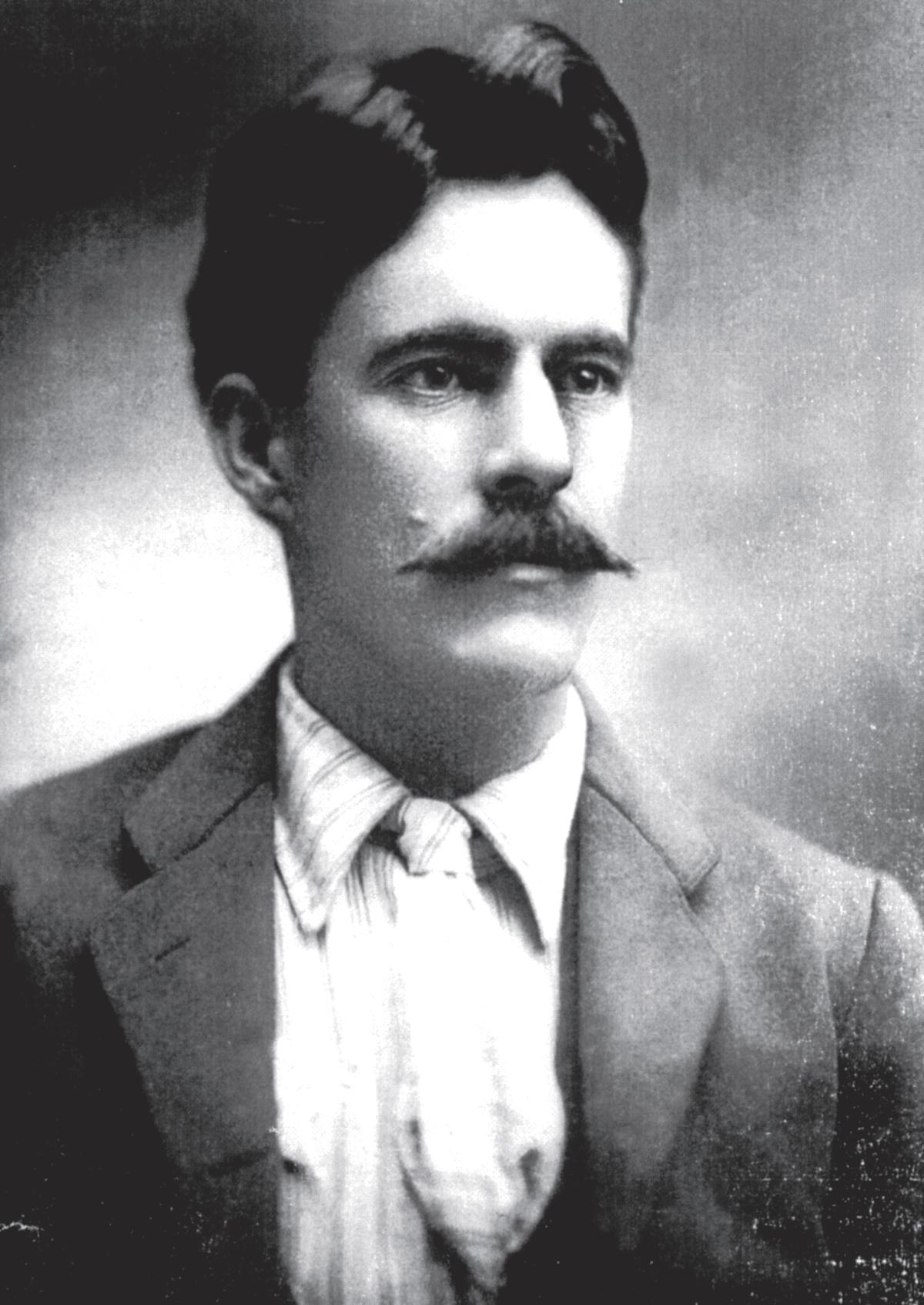
- Born: Harry Cornwall Wheeler; June 23, 1875; Jacksonville, Florida, United States
- Died: December 17, 1925 (aged 50); Bisbee, Arizona, United States
- Military career
- Allegiance: United States of America
- Branch: United States Army
- Conflicts: Spanish–American War: Santiago Campaign; World War I: Western Front
- Other work: Arizona Ranger, Sheriff

Harry Cornwall Wheeler (July 23, 1875 – December 17, 1925) was an Arizona lawman who was the third captain of the Arizona Rangers, as well as the sheriff of Cochise County, serving from 1912 into 1918. He is known as the lead figure in the illegal mass kidnapping and deportation of some 1200 miners and family members, many of them immigrants, from Bisbee, Arizona to New Mexico in 1917. Beginning on July 12, 1917, he took total control of the town of Bisbee, controlling access and running kangaroo courts that deported numerous people.

He was born and raised in Florida and was a veteran of the Spanish–American War and World War I. He served in the Arizona Rangers from 1903 to its disbanding in 1909.

== Biography ==
=== Early life and career ===
Harry C. Wheeler as captain of the Arizona Rangers.

Harry Wheeler, the son of Colonel William B. Wheeler of the United States Army and his wife, was born in 1875 in Jacksonville, Florida. After some local schooling, in 1897, the 22-year-old Wheeler enlisted in the 1st Cavalry and fought in the Spanish–American War. He was given a medical discharge at the rank of sergeant in 1902.

A crack shot with a rifle or pistol, Wheeler joined the Arizona Rangers in 1903 and was promoted to sergeant four months later. In October 1904, Wheeler killed an outlaw at the Palace Saloon in Tucson. He was later involved in a shootout in Benson, where he killed a second man. In 1907, Wheeler replaced Thomas H. Rynning as captain of the Arizona Rangers, and served as the agency's leader until its disbanding in 1909.

=== Sheriff of Cochise County ===
In 1911, Wheeler was elected as Sheriff of Cochise County; he was re-elected in 1914 and 1916. During his tenure in office, Arizona adopted a statewide prohibition on the sale and manufacture of alcohol. Though exceptions were made for liquor that was for personal use only, Arizona was generally a dry state from 1915 until the end of nationwide prohibition in 1933.

Wheeler spent much of his second and third terms in office enforcing Arizona's prohibition laws and combatting bootlegging and smuggling. In March 1917, Wheeler and Constable Lafe Gibson engaged a party of Mexican smugglers in what would be Wheeler's final shootout as a border lawman. Armed with a Winchester rifle, Wheeler is believed to have killed at least one of the bootleggers, before the gang of outlaws retreated into the mountains. Two of the gang members were apprehended by Wheeler and Gibson soon after. Wheeler remained a stalwart enforcer of prohibition throughout his final years as the Sheriff of Cochise County.

This period was tumultuous in labor relations, particularly for mine workers. In June 1917, IWW Local 800, a union of miners in Bisbee, began a strike against the Phelps Dodge Corporation. Wheeler deputized 2,200 men from Bisbee and Douglas to act as a posse. On July 12, they arrested 2,000 people in Bisbee. Nearly 1,300 of the strikers and their supporters were eventually deported in 23 cattle cars to Hermanas, New Mexico, without supplies, in what became known as the Bisbee Deportation.

Prior to the deportation, Sheriff Wheeler established guards at all entrances to Bisbee and Douglas. Any citizen seeking to exit or enter the town over the next several months had to have a "passport" issued by Wheeler. Any adult male in town who was not known to the sheriff's men was brought before a secret sheriff's kangaroo court. Hundreds of citizens were tried, and most of them deported and threatened with lynching if they returned. Even long-time citizens of Bisbee were deported by this "court".

A commission appointed by President Woodrow Wilson investigated labor disputes in Arizona and concluded in its final report, issued November 6, 1917, that "The deportation was wholly illegal and without authority in law, either State or Federal."

=== Later life ===
Wheeler resigned as sheriff of Cochise County in March 1918 to enlist in the army at the rank of captain after the United States entered World War I. He was given an honorable discharge in December 1918, after being called back to Arizona for further court action based on the Bisbee Deportation.

On May 15, 1918, the U.S. Department of Justice ordered the arrest of 21 Phelps Dodge executives, Calumet and Arizona Co. executives, and several Bisbee and Cochise County elected leaders and law enforcement officers. The arrestees included Walter Douglas, and would have included Sheriff Wheeler if he had not been serving in France with the American Expeditionary Force during World War I.

A pre-trial motion by the defense resulted in a federal district court releasing the 21 men on the grounds that no federal laws had been violated. The Justice Department appealed. But in United States v. Wheeler, 254 U.S. 281 (1920), Chief Justice Edward Douglass White ruled for an 8-to-1 majority that no federal law protected the freedom of movement for individuals. Protecting citizens' right to movement was a state function, White argued, and had to be enforced solely in state court.

Wheeler ran for Cochise County sheriff again in 1922 but was defeated in the Democratic primary. He settled in the Bisbee area. There he died from pneumonia in December 1925.

== See also ==
- Gleeson Gunfight
- Shootout in Benson

Preceded by Thomas H. Rynning	Captain of the Arizona Rangers; 1907–1909	Arizona Rangers disbanded
Police appointments
Preceded by John F. White	Sheriff of Cochise County, Arizona; 1911–1918	Succeeded by Guy Welch
