= Arizona Rangers =

Nonprofit volunteer group

- Motto: Few but proud, then and now.

Agency overview
- Formed: March 21, 1901 (initial); 1957 (revival)
- Dissolved: 1909 (initial)
- Volunteers: 500+

Jurisdictional structure
- Operations jurisdiction: United States
- Legal jurisdiction: Arizona
- Primary governing body: Arizona Rangers Board of Directors
- Secondary governing body: Arizona Rangers Board of Governors
- General nature: Civilian police

Operational structure
- Headquarters: Phoenix, AZ
- Sworn members: 500+

Website
- www.azrangers.us

The Arizona Rangers are a volunteer, non-commissioned civilian organization that assists law enforcement agencies in Arizona at their request and under their direction. They also provide security services for government and nonprofit organizations, as well as youth and community services.

The original Arizona Rangers were created in 1901 in the Arizona Territory. Modeled after the Texas Rangers, they were tasked with pursuing and arresting outlaws, particularly along the United States-Mexican border. The territorial legislature repealed the act establishing the Rangers in 1909. The modern organization was established in 1957 with the assistance of four former members of the territorial force and was officially recognized by the State of Arizona in 2002.

== History ==
=== First Territorial Rangers ===
The Territorial Governor created the Arizona Rangers in 1901. The Arizona Rangers were created to rid the Arizona Territory of crime and corruption so it could become a State. The Arizona Rangers are often confused with similar-sounding groups formed in the early 1860s; however, there is no connection. The first Territorial Rangers were organized to police the new gold boomtowns and mining camps in the western half of the New Mexico Territory that arose after the first gold strike in 1858 in Gila City.

The Rangers were well-trained, well-equipped, and very effective at apprehending even the most dangerous of outlaws, evolving into one of the finest law enforcement agencies in the country. Modeled after the Texas Rangers, the Arizona Rangers were tasked with hunting down and arresting outlaws in the Territory, especially along the Mexican border. By 1908, most of the outlaws had been arrested, killed, or had fled into Mexico. The Rangers were disbanded for political reasons in 1909. Shortly afterward, Arizona became the 48th state.

=== The Original Arizona Rangers ===
Originally, only one company was authorized, consisting of a captain, a sergeant and not more than twelve privates, but, in 1903, the force was increased to twenty-six men. The Rangers, many of whom in the early years were veterans of Theodore Roosevelt's Rough Riders, were skilled horsemen, trackers and marksmen. Though originally intended to be covert, the group became widely publicized and conspicuous, sported their badges boldly, and were distinctively well-armed. In addition to dealing with rustlers, and other outlaws, the Rangers were called on to deal with several large strikes by Mexican workers at mines in Arizona and Sonora, Mexico. During the Cananea Riot in 1906, managers of the mine stampeded horses and fired shots into a crowd of striking Mexican miners, killing two. The Mexicans retaliated, burning a building with four Americans trapped inside. In response, and against the Governor's orders, Captain Thomas H. Rynning joined a civilian posse of 275 men and rode to Cananea to assist Mexican Federal Troops and state mounted police. Tensions flared and shots were fired. When the smoke cleared, more than twenty-five men, both Mexican and American lay dead.

On February 15, 1909, the Arizona legislature repealed the act establishing the Arizona Rangers. During the seven years of its operations, 107 men served with the Rangers. The vote to disband was vetoed by Republican Governor Joseph Henry Kibbey, but the Democratic-dominated assembly overrode the veto, backed by political pressure from county sheriffs and district attorneys in northern Arizona.

After the Arizona Rangers disbanded, many of the former Rangers stayed in law enforcement. Harry C. Wheeler was elected sheriff of Cochise County and Thomas Rynning became the prison warden in Yuma, Arizona.

Seven former Rangers reunited in 1940 to ride together in the Prescott Rodeo Parade. In 1955, the Arizona legislature authorized a $100 monthly pension for former Rangers who had served at least six months and who still lived in Arizona. Five men qualified for this pension.

William MacLeod Raine wrote the following about crime in Arizona Territory and the effectiveness of the Arizona Rangers in a 1905 edition of Pearson's Magazine:

The work assigned to these Rangers was arduous and dangerous one. For many years sheriff's officers and vigilantes had found themselves entirely unable to cope with the lawless bands which made their headquarters in the bad lands. But the condition of affairs had grown unendurable. The temerity of the outlaws was not only a scourge to the community, but a menace to the good name of the Territory. No man's sheep or cattle were safe from the raids of the organized bands of outlaws, who would sweep down on a range, drive away the cattle, reach the mountain fastnesses long before the posse could be organized for pursuit. Raids and murders had become so common that they were scarcely noted. There were a dozen bands of the horse and cattle thieves, at the head of which were such man as 'Bill' Smith, the notorious Augustine Chacon, commonly called 'Pelelo', and the train robber, Burt Alvord. Yet within a year of the time of its organization, this little band of rangers, consisting of a captain, a sergeant and twelve privates, had practically cleared the territory of hundreds of bad characters. Many of them had paid for their lawlessness with their lives and the rest had been driven across the line into Mexico... The Rangers are recruited from old cow-boys and from the ranks of Teddy Roosevelt's Rough Riders. They have to be able to rope and ride anything on four legs, as their horses may be killed and remounts are at times absolutely necessary. Especially quick work is required in heading fugitives from the border. A crime is reported, the ranger slaps on the saddle and is away. To the credit of the ranger it may be said that nine times out of ten he brings back his man, dead or alive.

=== The Modern Arizona Rangers ===
In 1957 a nonprofit organization called the Arizona Rangers was organized, founded with the assistance of four former members of the agency. The modern Arizona Rangers were officially recognized by the state of Arizona in 2002, when Arizona Governor Jane Hull signed Legislative Act 41–4201. The purpose of this act was "to recognize the Arizona Rangers, who formed in 1901, disbanded in 1909 and reestablished in 1957 by original Arizona Rangers." The recognition by the State of Arizona gives no law enforcement authority to the organization. Members of the organization receive 24 hours of initial training and then ongoing monthly training. Rangers are required to qualify to Arizona Peace Officers Standard of Training (AZPOST) with their firearms, batons, Tasers, handcuffs, and OC spray.

In 2002, the modern Arizona Rangers were officially recognized by the State of Arizona when the Legislature passed Arizona Revised Statute (ARS) 41-4201, authorizing the Arizona Rangers to provide armed law enforcement assistance to any Local, State, Federal or Tribal law enforcement agency in Arizona. Governor Jane Hull then signed this into law, amending ARS Title 41 – State Government. In addition, the Arizona Rangers are exempt from private security regulations under ARS 32-2606 authorizing the Rangers to provide armed public safety services for a variety of nonprofit organizations. Arizona Rangers may exercise powers of arrest under ARS 13–3884. However, while working certain duties (for example, court security and prisoner transportation) or at the direction and under the authority of requesting agencies, the Arizona Rangers do have full arrest authority.

The present-day Arizona Rangers are an unpaid, all-volunteer, law enforcement support and assistance civilian nonprofit organization in the state of Arizona. They fulfill a three-point mission: 1. Law Enforcement support, by working co-operatively at the request of and under the direction, control, and supervision of established law enforcement officials and officers; 2. Government and non-profit security services; and 3. Youth support and community services. All aspects of their mission preserve the tradition, honor, and history of the original Arizona Rangers.

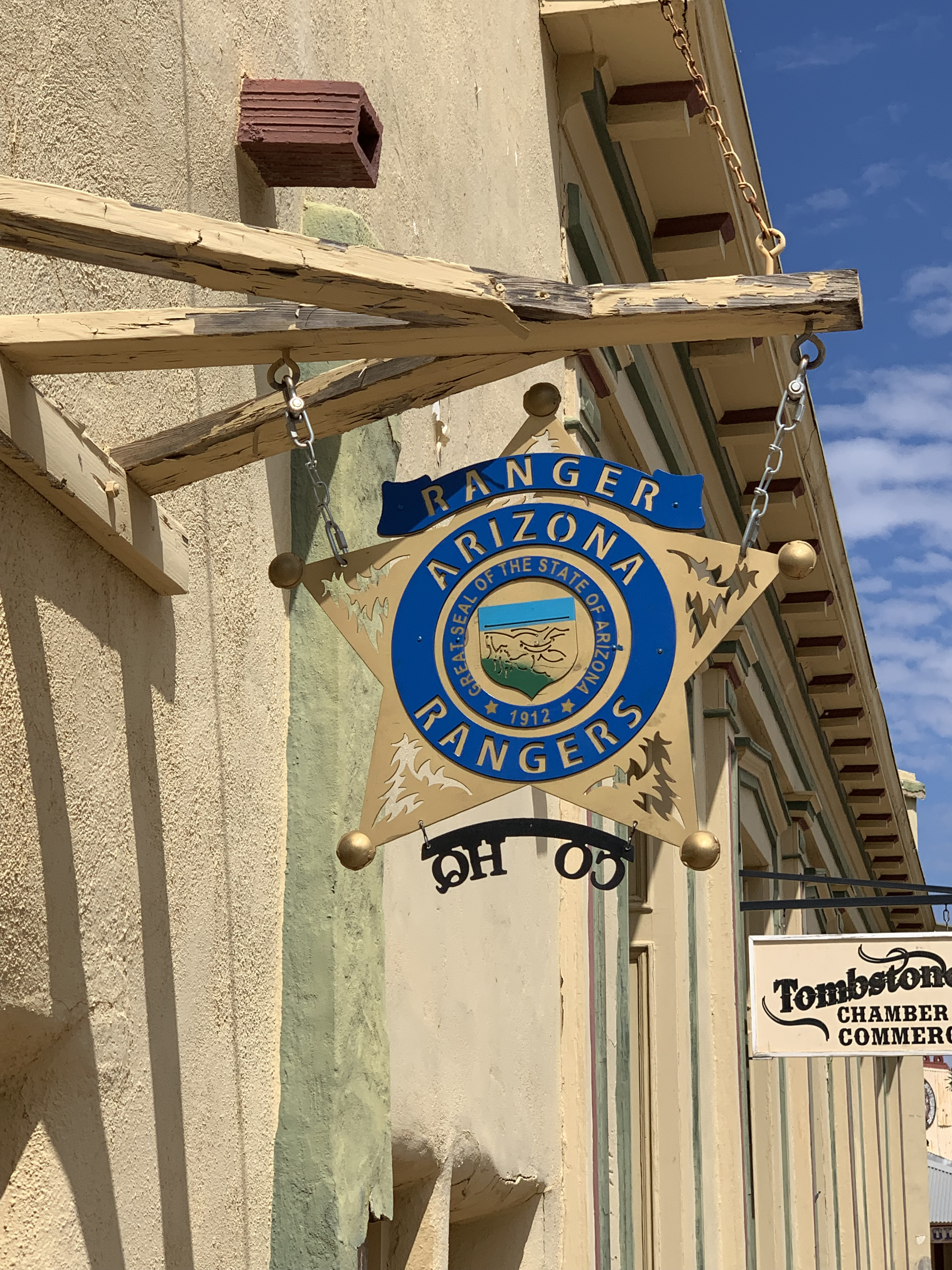

The Rangers operate throughout the State of Arizona, but use about 22 Companies that operate semi-independently as local geography and community needs dictate while operating within the guidelines of a statewide organization. Each Company has a Captain who is a member of the Board of Governors and operationally reports to an Area Commander. So while there is only one Arizona Rangers organization, the Company Captains have latitude to make adjustments as to how their Company fulfills the mission in their local area.

When an applicant applies to become a Ranger, a full background investigation and a physical fitness test are performed to ensure qualified candidates are selected. When an applicant is accepted, they are placed on probation until they complete all requirements, which includes the Arizona Ranger Training Academy, a minimum of 24 hours of supervised duty with a field training officer, a minimum of 90 days on probation status, and meet any other requirements placed upon them by the company.

== Leadership ==
The first captain of the Arizona Rangers was Burton C. Mossman of Bisbee, Arizona. Mossman, who had previously been manager of the 2-million-acre (8,100 km^{2}) Aztec Land and Cattle Company in northern Arizona, had some success in controlling rustling of his company's cattle.

In July 1902, after successfully recruiting and organizing the original Rangers, Mossman resigned to return to ranching. He was replaced by Thomas H. Rynning. The third and last commander of the Arizona Rangers was Harry C. Wheeler.

In general, the men of the Arizona Rangers were extremely capable; their exploits were widely reported by the newspapers of the day. Many of these reports are collected in the book, The Arizona Rangers, edited by Joseph Miller.

== Uniforms and insignia ==
Arizona Rangers were not issued standardized uniforms, as they were originally intended to operate undercover.

Badges of the Arizona Rangers, which were first issued in 1903 were solid silver five-pointed ball-tipped stars, lettered in blue enamel with engravings etched in blue, and are a valuable collectible. An officer's badge was engraved with the Ranger's name, while badges for enlisted men were numbered. Upon resignation, a Ranger returned his badge, which was then available to be assigned to a new Ranger.

== Similar agencies ==
The Arizona Rangers had been preceded by the organization of the Arizona Territorial Rangers in 1860. This group was formed by the Provisional Territorial Government, principally to protect against Apache raids. The intent was to have three companies of Territorial Rangers, two were formed in the mining camp of Pinos Altos, known as the "Arizona Guards" and the "Minute Men", and another, the "Arizona Rangers", in Mesilla by Captain James Henry Tevis.

With the arrival of Baylor's Confederate Army in Mesilla and his declaration of a Confederate Territory of Arizona in early 1862, the Arizona Territorial Rangers were disbanded by Captain Tevis who joined San Elizario Spy Company in the Confederate Army. The Confederate Territorial Governor, General Baylor eventually saw the need for the rangers also and formed Company A, Arizona Rangers as the first of three companies for the defense of Arizona Territory. It was commanded by Captain Sherod Hunter and Second Lieutenant James Henry Tevis. The Arizona Rangers were sent to Tucson to defend western Arizona Territory. When the California Column drove the Confederates out of Arizona Territory, plans for organizing the Arizona Rangers were put off for years.

In the early 1880s, Arizona was not only having an Indian war, but border crimes and killings were making Arizona unfit to live in. Upon taking office, Governor Frederick Augustus Tritle faced a problem of lawlessness within the territory caused by outlaw cowboys and hostile natives. On April 24, 1882, he authorized formation of the 1st Company of Arizona Rangers in Tombstone making John H. Jackson its captain. They were to be similar to Texas Rangers and combat outlaws and hostile Indians. His first assignment to the Rangers was to scout near the border of the territory for Indians, and for those who recently killed a teamster there. The Rangers Captain was only able to pay the first months wages, and the Governor despite his best efforts was never able to get them funded by the Territorial Legislature or Congress. On May 20, he wrote Johnston informing them they should continue until the end of the month when their pay ran out. Following the Earp Vendetta Ride and the departure of the Earps lawlessness in the area seems to have quieted.

The analogous agency in the Territory of New Mexico, organized in 1905, was called the New Mexico Mounted Patrol. Across the Mexican border in northern Sonora was a similar law enforcement agency called the Guardia Rural, colloquially known as the rurales. This group is often confused with another group often referred to with the same colloquialism, the Guardia Fiscal, which was commanded by a Russian, Colonel Emilio Kosterlitzky, who cooperated closely with the Rangers.

Another group known as the Arizona Rangers is based in Tucson and is part of Missouri Western Shooters.

== Fallen Rangers ==
During the tenure of the Arizona Rangers, three officers died in the line of duty.

Ranger	Date of death	Details
Carlos Tafolla	October 8, 1901	Killed after the Battleground Gunfight
Jefferson P. "Jeff" Kidder	April 5, 1908	Killed after a gunfight in Naco, Sonora
John W. Thomas Jr.	July 21, 1992	Killed after a shootout in Sierra Vista, Arizona

== See also ==
- List of Arizona Rangers
- List of law enforcement agencies in Arizona
- Texas Rangers
- California Rangers
- Colorado Rangers
- Indiana Rangers
- New Mexico Mounted Patrol
- Big Iron
