= George Scarborough (cowboy) =

American old west lawman (1859–1900)

- Born: October 2, 1859; Natchitoches Parish, Louisiana, United States
- Died: April 5, 1900 (aged 40); Deming, New Mexico Territory, United States
- Cause of death: Gunshot wound
- Occupations: Lawman, Cowboy, Gunfighter

George Scarborough (October 2, 1859 – April 5, 1900) was a cowboy and lawman who lived during the time of the Wild West. He is best known for having killed outlaw John Selman, killer of John Wesley Hardin, and for his partnership with lawman Jeff Milton, with the pair bringing down several outlaws during their time together.

== Early life, controversial killing ==
Scarborough was born in Natchitoches Parish, Louisiana. His family moved to Texas, where for a while he worked as a cowboy. In 1885, he was appointed sheriff for Jones County. He would later work as a Deputy US Marshal in and around El Paso, Texas. On June 21, 1895, while working alongside El Paso police chief Jeff Milton, Scarborough shot and killed Martin M'Rose, a Texas rustler. M'Rose is buried near John Wesley Hardin, and Texas Ranger Ernest St. Leon. Jeff Milton was Chief of Police in El Paso at that time, and Scarborough was a US Marshal. M'Rose had been captured, and was killed while being brought back from Mexico by the two lawmen on an outstanding warrant. Outlaw, gunman and paramour of Mrs. M'Rose, John Wesley Hardin, claimed that he had paid Scarborough and Milton to kill Martin M'Rose. Milton and Scarborough were arrested, but Hardin later withdrew his comments and the men were released.

Scarborough became well known for his unusual tactics when tracking a wanted outlaw. Often, he would drop himself down to the level of those he was pursuing. This tactic was extremely effective, and made him a hated and feared man among the outlaw element. There are many accusations that he was actively and ambitiously involved in outlaw gangs which he betrayed, but no one ever conclusively proved he was involved in unlawful actions. In July, 1898, Scarborough and Milton tracked, shot and captured outlaw "Bronco Bill" Walters, killing another member of Walters' gang, and scattering the rest from their hideout near Solomonville, Arizona. In late 1899 and into 1900, Scarborough pursued the Burt Alvord gang. The beginning of the gang's end came during a February 15, 1900, gunfight between five of the gang members and Jeff Milton in Fairbank, Arizona, during which gang member "Three Fingered Jack" Dunlop was killed, and both gang member Bravo Juan Yaos as well as Milton were wounded.

== Killing of John Selman ==
Scarborough had long feuded with lawman/outlaw Old John Selman. On April 5, 1894, acting as Constable of El Paso Selman shot and killed Scarborough's close friend and former Texas Ranger Bass Outlaw. Selman was tried for the killing and found not guilty.

In reality, Bass Outlaw was not innocent in his own death. Intoxicated, he threatened to kill a local judge and was ordered by Selman to return home and sleep off his intoxication. Outlaw instead visited a brothel then a saloon. He argued with Texas Ranger Joe McKirdict, who attempted to talk him into leaving. Outlaw shot and killed Ranger McKirdict, then turned on Selman, who engaged him in a gunfight. Selman was wounded twice in the thigh. Outlaw was killed. The killing was found justified by the court.

On August 19, 1895, John Selman murdered John Wesley Hardin at the Acme Saloon Bar in El Paso.

In 1896, on the second anniversary of his friend Outlaw's death, Scarborough supposedly called Selman into the alley behind the Wigwam Saloon where two men argued and fought. Scarborough claimed both drew their guns so he fatally shot Selman; however, no gun was found on Selman's body. Later a thief who claimed to have stolen Selman's gun immediately after the gun fight was arrested before Scarborough's trial.

Scarborough was acquitted. He then moved to Deming, New Mexico, where he worked as a gunman for the Grant County Cattlemen's Association. He was also associated with the arrest of Pearl Hart.

== Death ==
On April 1, 1900, Scarborough was involved in a shootout with George Stevenson and James Brooks. He killed one of the men but was shot in the leg and was taken back to Deming where the leg was amputated. He died four days later – coincidentally six years to the day after the death of his friend Texas Ranger Bass Outlaw, and four years after he shot Outlaw's killer, John Selman. An alternate story claims that on April 5, 1900, Scarborough and Walter Birchfield were tracking Harvey Logan (a.k.a. "Kid Curry") near San Simon, Arizona, and trapped him near the Triangle Canyon. A gunfight ensued, in which Scarborough was mortally wounded by Curry.

== Sources ==
- Tombstone of Martin M'Rose
- Tombstone of George Scarborough
- El Paso, Texas, Police Department
- "George Scarborough: the life and death of a lawman on the closing frontier" by Robert K. DeArment
- "Fearless Dave Allison: Border Lawman" by Bob Alexander
- Scarborough Family Genealogy
