= Fairbank train robbery =

1900 crime in Arizona

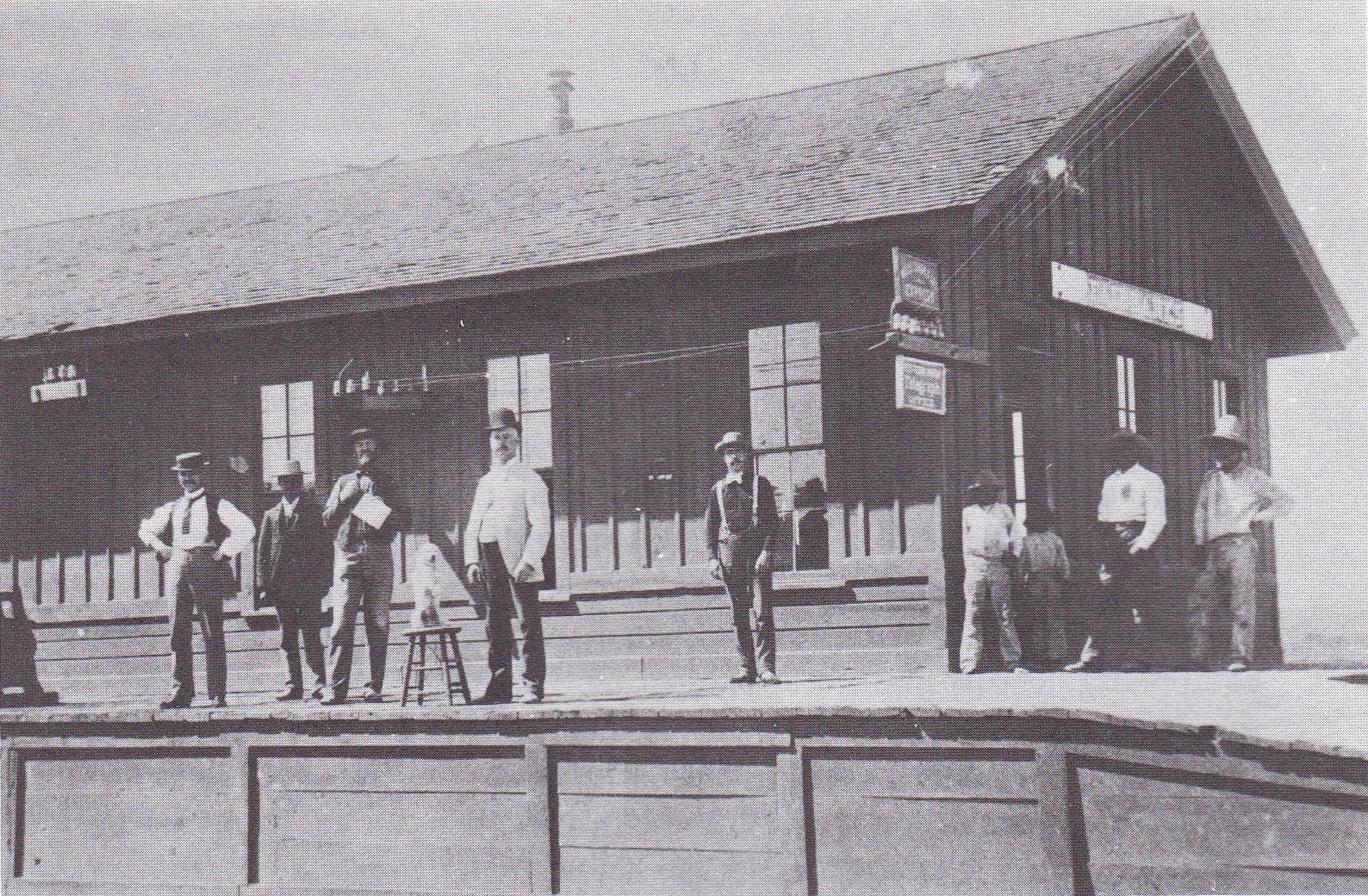
- The railroad depot in Fairbank, c.1900.
- Date: February 15, 1900
- Location: Fairbank, Arizona Territory, United States
- Participants: Jeff Milton; Jack Dunlop †
- Deaths: 1
- Injuries: 2

The Fairbank train robbery occurred on the night of February 15, 1900, when some bandits attempted to hold up a Wells Fargo express car at the town of Fairbank, Arizona. Although it was thwarted by Jeff Milton, who managed to kill "Three Fingered Jack" Dunlop in an exchange of gunfire, the train robbery was unique for being one of the few to have occurred in a public place and was also one of the last during the Old West period.

== Background ==
In the 1890s, Burt Alvord and his partner in crime, Billy Stiles, were serving as deputy sheriffs in Willcox. Law enforcement paid little, though, so they began robbing trains belonging to the Southern Pacific Railroad. For a while they managed to be successful and went undetected by their fellow lawmen.

According to James H. McClintock, train robbery was popular in Arizona at the time, which was exemplified by the passing of a statute in 1889 that made it punishable by death. However, the law was never enforced and several train robberies occurred between 1889 and 1899. One of the most daring, according to McClintock, was the Cochise Train Robbery. On September 9, 1899, Alvord's gang robbed a train as it was stopped at the town of Cochise. There they forced the staff off at gunpoint and then blew up the safe with dynamite. After taking several thousand dollars in gold coins and bills, the gang rode into the Chiricahua Mountains, unsuccessfully pursued by a posse under Sheriff Scott White and George Scarborough.

Like at Fairbank, the Cochise robbery took place in public as well, although it was nearly midnight and there was no gunfight. According to the Historical Atlas of the Outlaw West, by Richard M. Patterson: "Most Western train robberies occurred on a lonely stretch of track, usually far enough outside the nearest town to give the robbers plenty of time to raid the express car or the passenger coaches and disappear over the nearest ridge." Alvord and Stiles must have thought it was easier to rob a train in town than in the middle of nowhere so they came up with a plan to hold up a Wells Fargo express car as it was stopped in front of the train station in Fairbank. The express car, Alvord hoped, would be carrying the United States Army's payroll for the soldiers stationed at Fort Huachuca. Also, the crowd of people that was sure to be gathered at the station would provide the bandits with human shields.

The train was traveling from Nogales to Benson, but it had to stop at the little town of Fairbank, located a few miles west of Tombstone, to offload some cargo. Alvord and Stiles knew that Jeff Milton was working for Southern Pacific as an express messenger so they made arrangements to have five men rob the train on a night that he was not supposed to be working. In the meantime, Alvord and Stiles would maintain their guise as honorable deputies.

== Robbery ==
The night chosen for the robbery was February 15, 1900, and the five bandits were Bob Brown, or Burns, "Bravo Juan" Tom Yoas, the brothers George and Louis Owens, and "Three Fingered Jack" Dunlop. When they arrived in town, the bandits dismounted and blended in with the crowd, pretending to be drunken cowboys.

At this point there are some conflicting accounts, although there are only slight variations. According to Bill O'Neal's Encyclopedia of Western Gunfighters, as the train approached Fairbank Jeff Milton was standing at the open door of the express car when the bandits opened fire on him from the station and wounded him. However, according to Robert M. Patterson, the train came to a full stop before the bandits made their approach and one of them shouted "Hands up!" to Milton before the shooting started.

According to Patterson's version, at first Milton thought that the call to surrender was a joke, but, when the bandits called out a second time and shot off his hat, he quickly reassessed the situation. Milton was substituting for a friend at the time of the robbery and otherwise would not have been on the train. He had left his revolver on his desk inside the car, but his sawed-off shotgun was next to the door and within reach. Milton hesitated though because using his shotgun would put innocent bystanders at risk. So when the bandits decided to open fire again one of their first shots struck Milton in the left shoulder. Milton then fell to the floor badly wounded, but he managed to grab his shotgun just in time to use it on Dunlop, who was trying to enter the car. Eleven pellets struck Dunlop somewhere in his body and a final pellet hit Yoas in the upper leg or behind.

After the initial exchange, Brown and the Owens brothers began firing volleys into the express car while Yoas ran away to mount his horse. In response to the fire, Milton crawled over to the metal door of the car and slammed it shut just as another volley came in. He then applied a makeshift tourniquet, hid the key to the safe behind some luggage, and fell unconscious.

Because of his final acts, when the bandits boarded the train they thought Milton was dead and they could not find the key. Without the key or dynamite, there was no way to open the safe so the wounded Dunlop was loaded onto his horse and the bandits rode out of town. According to James H. McClintock, the bandits got away with only seventeen Mexican pesos.

== Aftermath ==
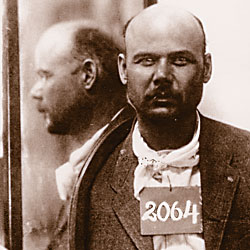
Burt Alvord at the Yuma Territorial Prison in 1904.

The bandits headed for the Dragoon Mountains, but, at a point six miles from Tombstone, Dunlop had to be left behind with a bottle of whiskey to ease his pain. Possemen under the command of Sheriff Scott White found Dunlop on the next morning and a few days later they captured Brown and the Owens brothers while they were traversing a pass in the Dragoons. Dunlop later died in a Tombstone hospital, but not before revealing that Alvord and a local cattleman named William Downing had been involved in organizing the Cochise robbery. He was one of the last criminals to be buried in the Boothill Graveyard.

Initially the police thought Dunlop's claim that Alvord was somehow involved in the robbery must have been false, being that he was one of the "noisiest and most active pursuers." Later on, however, Billy Stiles surrendered and made a full confession. Stiles said that it was he and a man named Matt Burts who held up the train at Cochise, but it was Alvord and William Downing who planned the robbery and provided the dynamite for the safe. Stiles said he received only $480 for his participation in the robbery and it was believed that he confessed because of his dissatisfaction with his share. According to McClintock, the police treated Stiles as little more than a witness so he was not placed in jail and was allowed a certain amount of liberty. This would later prove to be a mistake.

When Alvord was arrested he was put in the Tombstone jail with Downing, Burts, and Yoas, who was captured in Cananea. He wasn't in jail for very long though because on April 7, 1900, Stiles broke in, shot Deputy Marshal George Bravin in the foot, and freed Alvord and Yoas. Downing refused to leave his cell and Burts was outside with a deputy sheriff at the time so the other three men took all the weapons they could find and then fled into the desert on stolen horses, leaving Downing and Burts in custody.

The bandits are next found at the home of Alvord's wife, a cattle ranch near Wilcox, where they announced that they intended to rob a few more trains. Meanwhile, the local police and territorial officials were busy authorizing various amounts of reward money for the capture of the bandits. There was also support from the private sector as well; William Cornell Greene, the owner of the large copper mine at Cananea, offered $10,000 for the capture of Alvord or Stiles.

The reward money made no difference though. Stiles remained on the run until he surrendered in 1902. He briefly served in the Arizona Rangers under Captain Burton C. Mossman before going to Mexico and rejoining Alvord, who was still at large. Finally, the Arizona Rangers entered Mexico and managed to wound both Alvord and Stiles during a shootout near the village of Naco in February 1904. Alvord was captured as result, but Stiles got away. He was eventually killed in Nevada while serving as a lawman under the name William Larkin.

Because he was popular among the authorities, Alvord was charged for "interferring (sic) with United States mails", instead of train robbery, which would have meant death. Alvord was put in the Yuma Territorial Prison and he remained there until 1906. When he was released, Alvord went to Central America and was last seen in 1910 while working on the Panama Canal. Bill Downing received similar treatment. Because he was a prominent cattleman, as well as a former member of the Bass Gang, Downing was not charged with train robbery either, but on another charge he served seven years in Yuma. Not long after his release, the Arizona Ranger Billy Speed shot and killed him.

Jeff Milton received much praise for foiling the Fairbank robbery. Although his arm was crippled, Milton continued serving as a lawman. He died in Tombstone in 1947.

In 1961, the Fairbank train station was moved to nearby Tombstone and restored. It now serves as the city library and is open to the general public.

== See also ==
- List of Old West gunfights
- Augustine Chacon
- Cochise County in the Old West
