= Bill Downing =

American Wild West outlaw

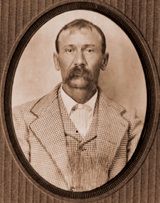
- William "Bill" Downing
- Born: Allegedly: Frank Jackson; 1860; Texas
- Died: August 5, 1908 (aged 47–48); Willcox, Arizona
- Resting place: Old City Cemetery in Willcox, Az
- Other names: William F. Downing "Bill"
- Known for: Notorious outlaw in the Wild West
- Spouse: Linda Downing

Bill Downing a.k.a. William F. Downing (1860 – August 5, 1908) was a notorious outlaw during the Wild West era in Arizona. Downing had fled from the Texas Rangers posse who was after him when he came to Arizona. In Arizona, he was involved in the killing of William S. “Slim” Traynor and in various train robberies including the robbery of the Train Depot in the town of Cochise. Downing was so unpopular that even members of his gang couldn't stand him.

== Early years ==
Downing was born in Texas. He was in trouble with the law when he came to Arizona Territory, with a Texas Rangers posse in pursuit. Allegedly his real name was Frank Jackson, a teenager who was a member of the Sam Bass gang. Jackson had been involved in a shoot-out at Round Rock, Texas between the Bass gang and the Texas Rangers in July, 1878. Jackson was shot in one leg, but survived. The posse killed Bass, however Jackson escaped and rode through New Mexico until he reached Arizona where he assumed the name William F. Downing. Once he settled down, he sent for his wife, Linda Downing who was also a native of Texas. Downing never spoke about his relationship with the Bass gang.

He and his wife settled down near the small Sulphur Springs Valley mining town of Pearce. Downing worked as a cowhand at nearby ranches. He was hired to work in the Esperanza Ranch, which was known for hiring rustlers, outlaws and renegade Apaches. Though Downing became known for his quarrelsome nature, he was also known to be less quarrelsome when he was drinking whiskey.

== The killing of William S. “Slim” Traynor ==
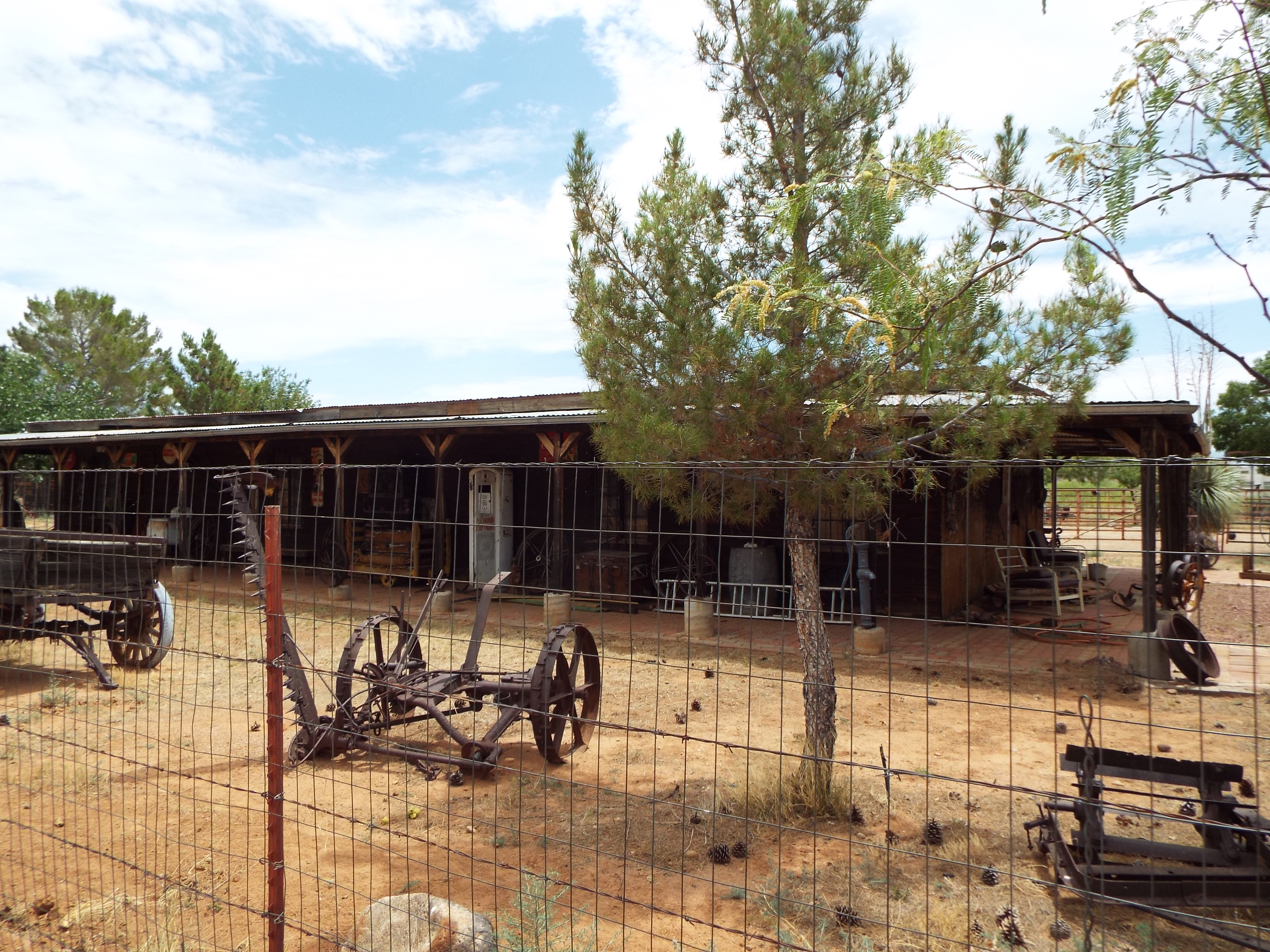
Ranch house in Pearce

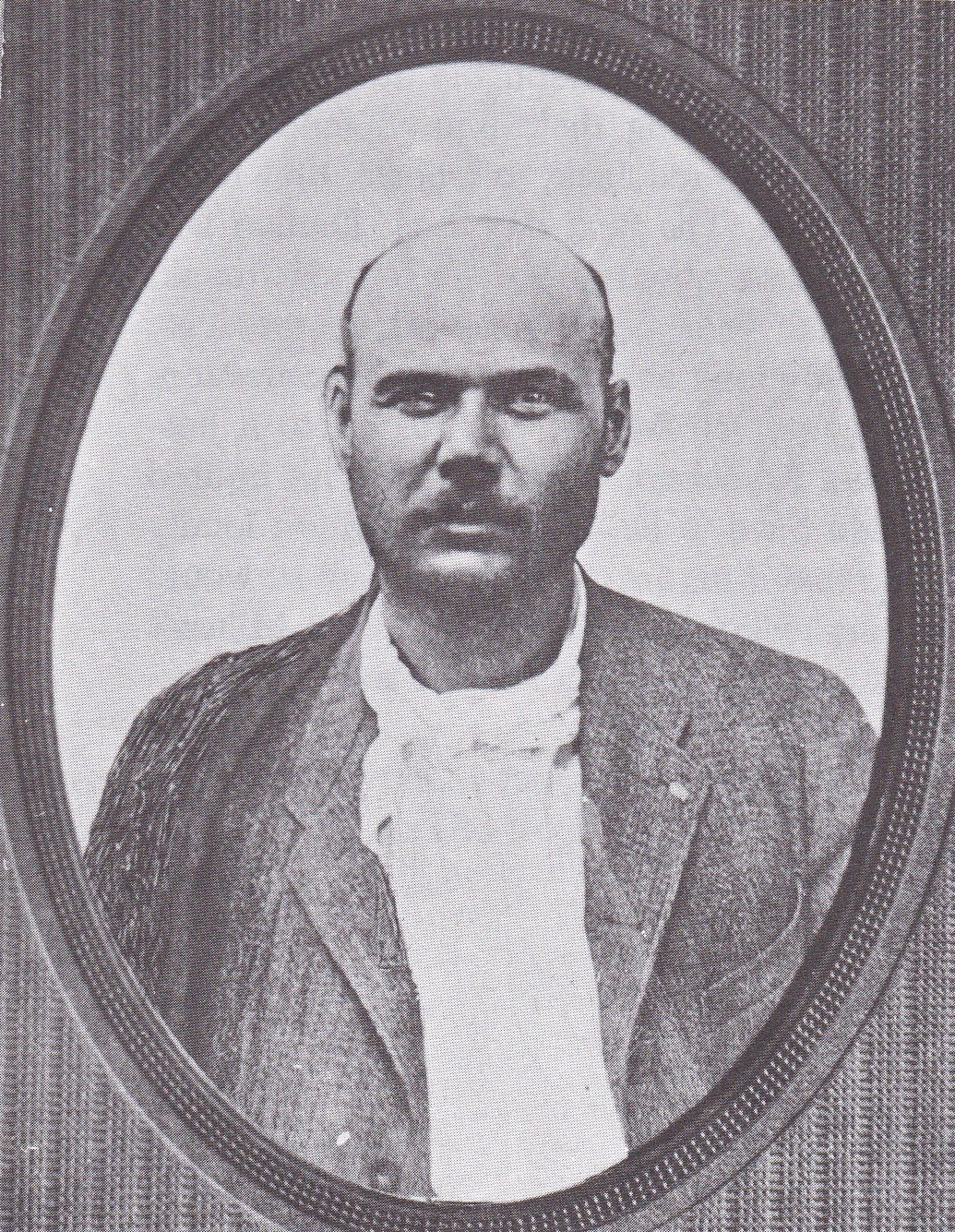
Constable Burt Alvord

Downing and his wife moved to the town of Willcox. There he spent most of his time hanging around saloons and associating with the members of an outlaw gang run by Albert R. “Burt” Alvord, who was the town constable when he wasn't working as a ranch-hand. However, there was a particular person whom Downing did not like and that was William S. “Slim” Traynor.

Traynor, who also went by the name of "Bill Traynor", was a native of Tennessee who at onetime had been an outlaw, mine guard and a veteran Rough Rider campaigning in Cuba during the Spanish-American War under the command of Theodore Roosevelt. He was hired by Edwin Russell Hooker, a cattle inspector, to look after his father, Henry Hooker, Sierra Bonita range interests. Traynor was engaged to be married to Mila Allaire, a young lady who was a member of a Willcox ranching family. He suspected Downing of stealing cattle and re-branding them. As such he made it known publicly that Downing was a rustler and that he was looking for him.

On the evening of May 19, 1899, Traynor and his friend Henry C. Taylor, an off-duty bartender, walked into Tom Fulghum's "Elite Saloon" on the corner of Maley and Haskell Streets. Some witnesses say that Downing came in after Traynor, while others claim that Downing was already in the saloon.

Witnesses to the events that followed stated that when Downing walked in, Traynor dropped his right hand as if going for his gun. Four shots rang out from Bill Downing's pistol and Bill Traynor lay dead on the barroom floor; shot through the head and chest. Downing was arrested and during his trial he claimed the following: "I accepted Taylor's invitation to take a cigar and as I answered, (Traynor) whirled around as though he went after his gun. As I stepped up to the bar, I was watching him on account of the threats he had made, and I looked outside. I thought it was a life-and-death matter and drew my gun and jerked Thomas Burts back so as not to shoot him and commenced shooting. I am not certain as to how many shots I fired.”

Constable Alvord testified that he took the pistol and belt off the person of the deceased. He continued to state that he found the pistol loaded with five cartridges and one empty chamber. The pistol was in the scabbard when he took it off the deceased. No one took and checked Downing's gun. According to Constable Alvord, Traynor's body bore wounds from three bullets. One had torn through his breast and exited his shoulder; the other two had penetrated his skull. The coroner's jury found that Downing was acting in self-defense and was justified.

== The Southern-Pacific Cochise Depot robbery ==
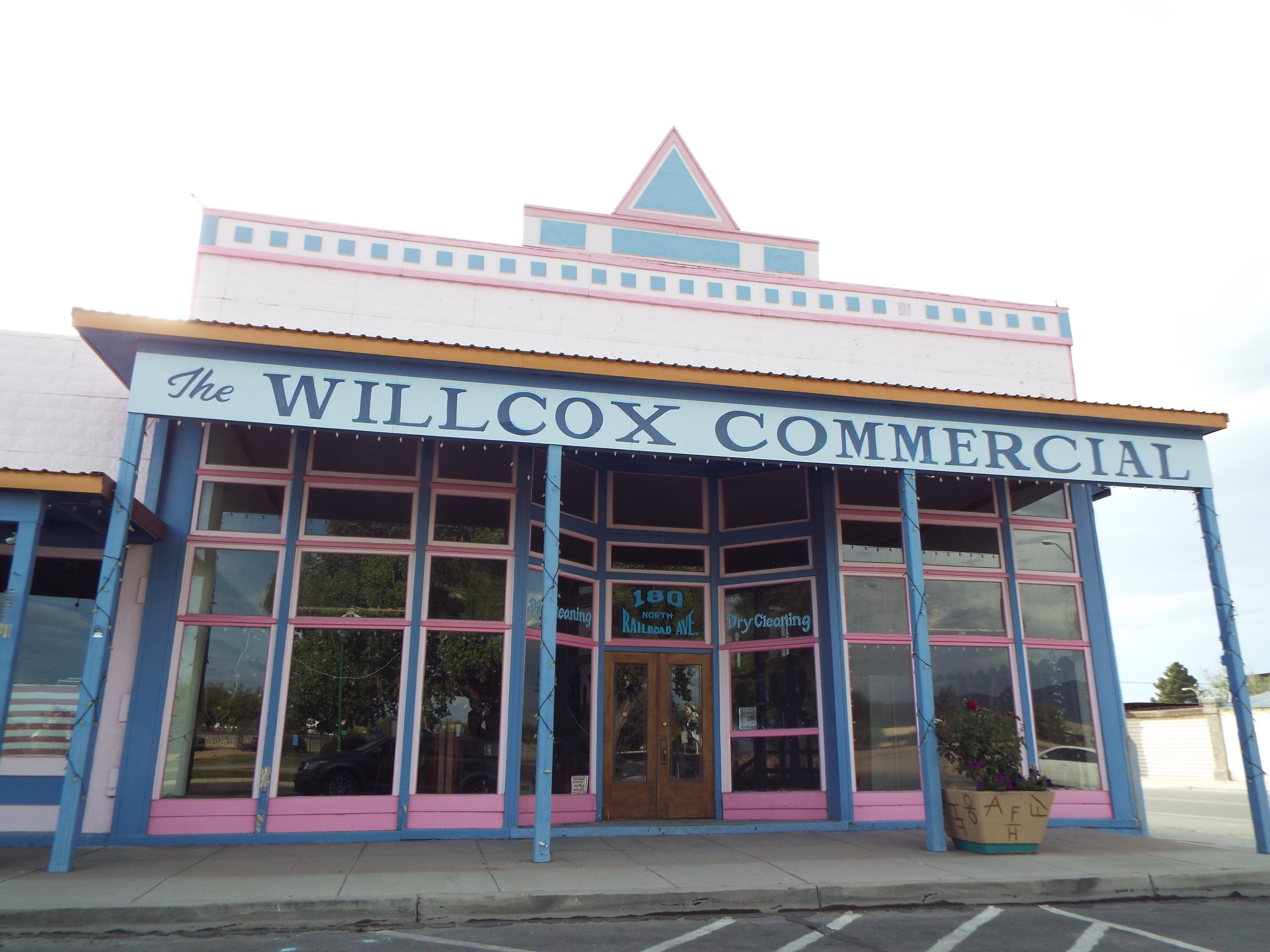
The Soto Brothers Mercantile store which originally was the John H. Norton and Company Store

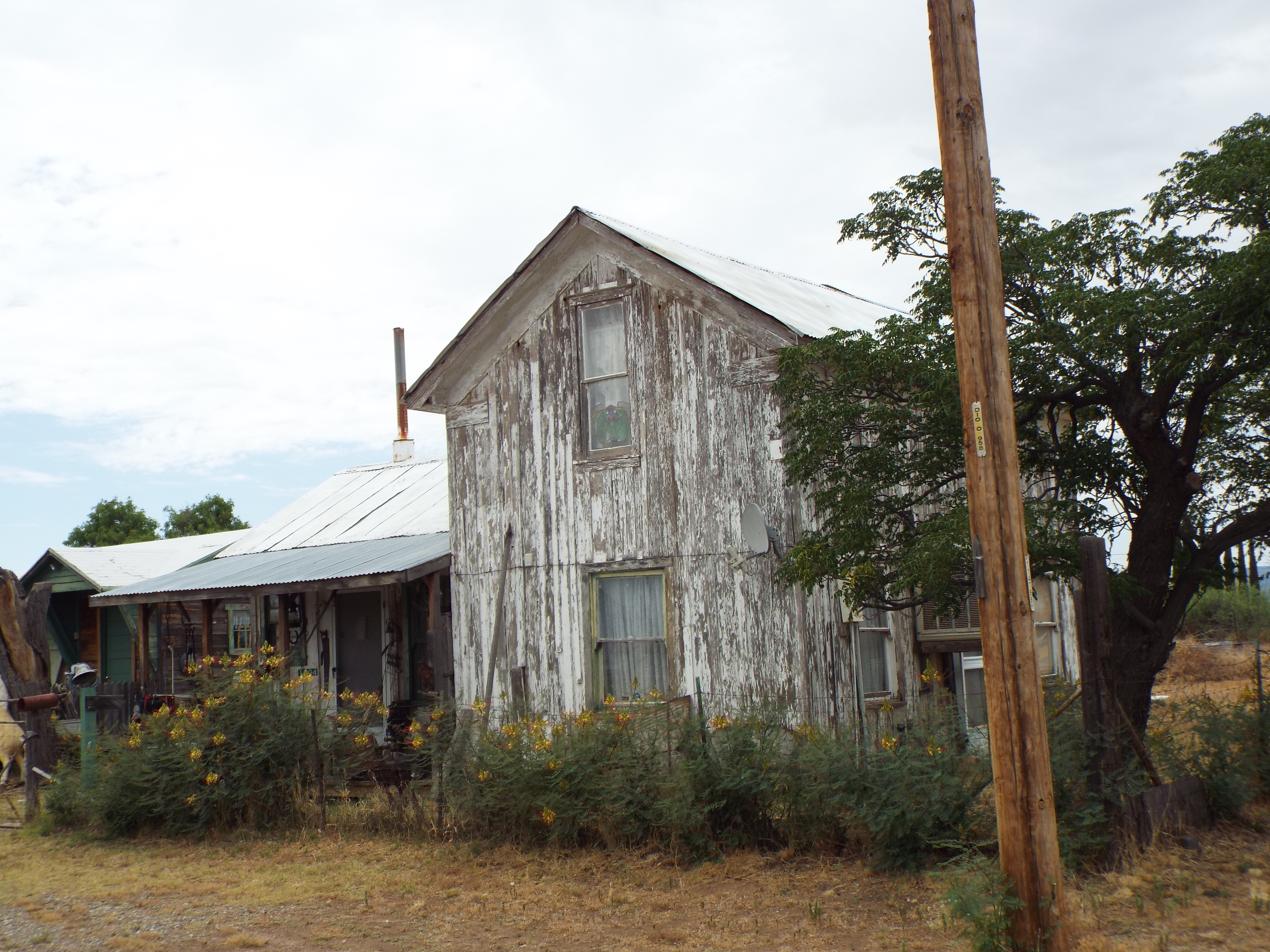
The Cochise Southern Pacific Railroad Train Depot in 2019

Constable Burt Alvord was hired by the town of Willcox to police the boisterous cowboys in the area because of his reputation of being a bad man in Tombstone. Alvord hired Bill Downing and Billy Stiles as deputies. Together with their newfound legality they would be able to pursue their criminal careers without arousing the suspicion of the town folks. Among the members of the newly founded Alvord-Stiles Gang were local cowboys, such as Matt Burts, the Owen brothers and Jack Dunlap.

They conspired to hold up the Southern Pacific's westbound No. 10 train that stopped at Cochise Station at Cochise Junction. In order to carry out their mission Downing burglarized the Soto Brothers Mercantile store in Willcox where they pilfered dynamite. Then, Downing and the gang burglarized a mining camp in Dos Cabezas, where they stole additional dynamite, plus explosive caps and fuse.

The date set for the robbery was September 9, 1899. It was Downing's responsibility to tend to the horses. Stiles and Burts were to stop the train at Cochise Station and proceed with the robbery. They held at gun point the engineer, the fireman, the mail clerk and a Wells Fargo man. The safe inside the express car was blown up. Their first heist was successful and they seized between $2,000 and $3,000 in cash and jewelry.

Constable Alvord organized a posse when news of the robbery reached Willcox. He sent the posses in all directions except the right one. Downing, Burts and Stiles stashed everything in Burt Alvord's chicken house in Willcox and then they "joined the posse." As expected the posse did not find anything. The stolen goods were removed from the chicken house and stashed in Bill Downing's ranch near Pearce. The only member of the gang that took his share was Matt Burts who headed to the state of Oregon.

== The failed Fairbank train robbery ==
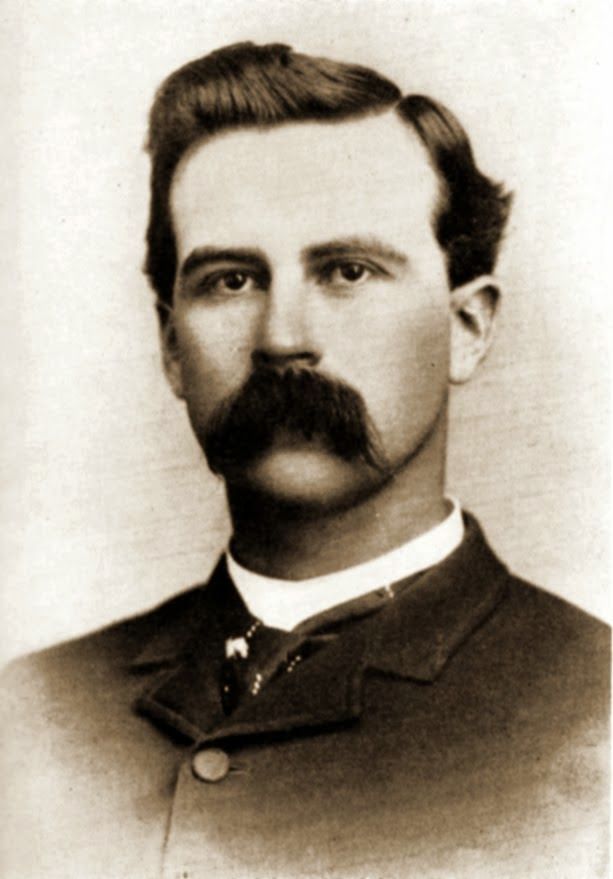
Jeff Milton

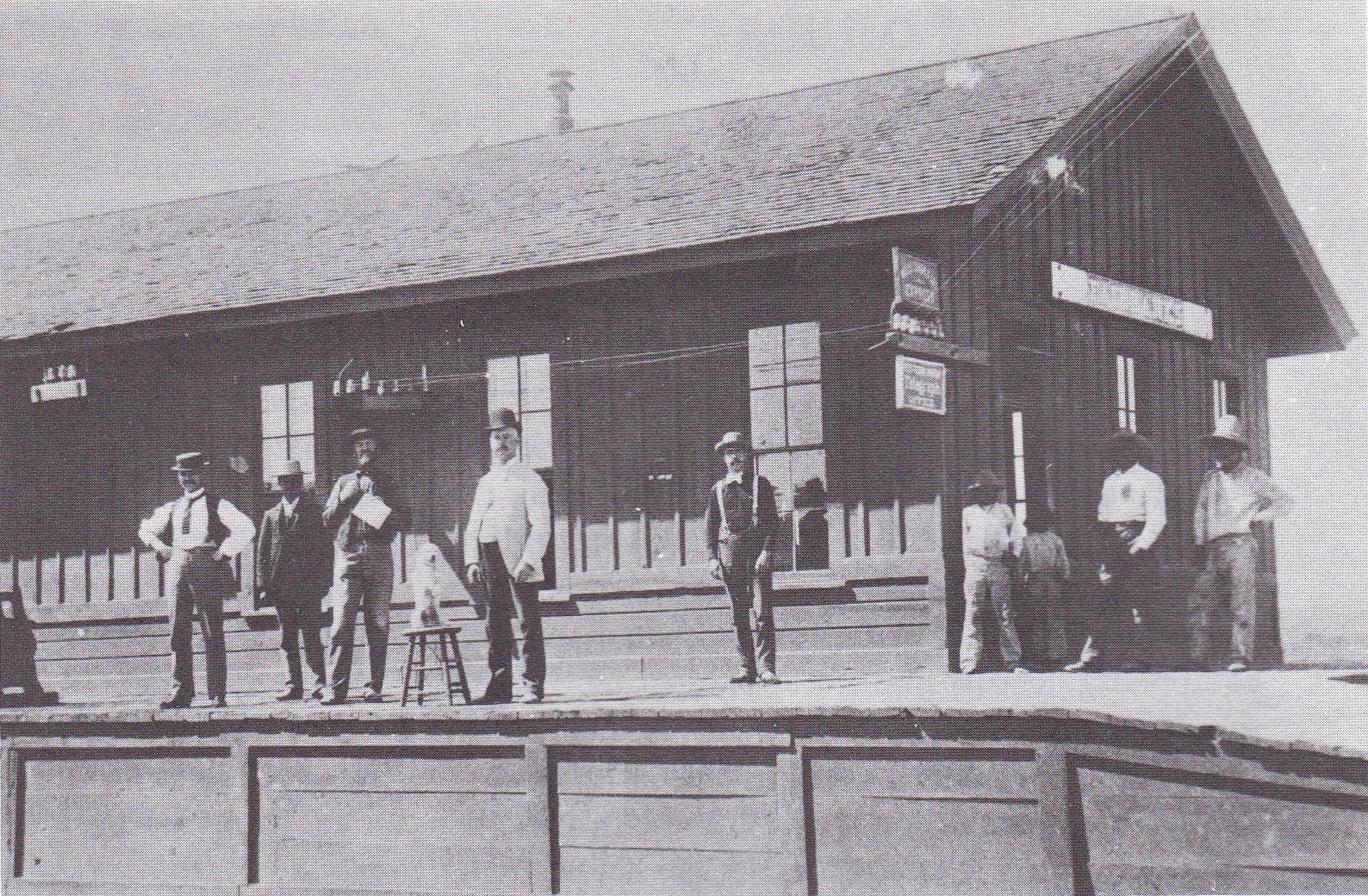
The railroad depot in Fairbank, c. 1900.

On February 15, 1900, the Alvord-Stiles Gang attempted a second major robbery, this time in Fairbank, Arizona. The members of the gang who participated in the holdup of the New Mexico & Arizona's northbound No. 1 on the Nogales-to-Benson line, were Jesse “Three-Fingered Jack” Dunlap, Tom “Bravo Juan” Yoas, Robert Brown, and George and Lewis Owings. However, they were unaware that Jeff Milton a Wells Fargo Express messenger was aboard the train that day. Milton, an ex-Texas Ranger, had a long career in law enforcement.

The gang's attempt to rob the train failed because of Milton's intervention. He fired his gun and shot Jack Dunlap despite the fact that he himself was wounded with a bullet on his left arm between the shoulder and elbow which shattered the bone and left his arm useless. The gang fled the scene and left Dunlap behind. When a posse from Tombstone arrived and found Dunlap, he decided to cooperate and told them the names of those involved in the attempted but failed robbery. Dunlap died shortly after the encounter, but not before implicating Burt Alvord, Billy Stiles and Bill Downing as the planners of the robbery.

Bill Downing and some members of the gang were arrested and sent to the jail in Tombstone, since he had been implicated in the earlier Southern-Pacific Cochise Depot holdup. At the time, train robbery was a capital offense in the Arizona Territory. Downing's trial was set for December 10, 1900, in the Tombstone Courthouse in what is officially known as "Territory of Arizona vs. W.F. Downing, case No. 745A". On April 7, 1900, Stiles went to Tombstone and went to the jailhouse. He shot Deputy Marshal George Bravin in the foot, and freed the gang members who were in the jail, with the exception of Downing. During the trial some of the members of the Alvord gang turned against Downing and testified against him. Stiles and Matt Burts were among those who testified for the prosecution. However, the majority of the jurors believed that capital punishment was not justified in cases where there were no deaths. Jury foreman L.A. Smith announced before Judge George Russell Davis that even though the jurors believed that Downing was guilty of train robbery, they refused to return a guilty verdict.

Even though Downing was acquitted in the robbery case, he was found guilty of interfering with the United States mail, a federal charge and was sentenced to 10 years of prison-time to be served in the Yuma Territorial Prison.

== Yuma Territorial Prison ==
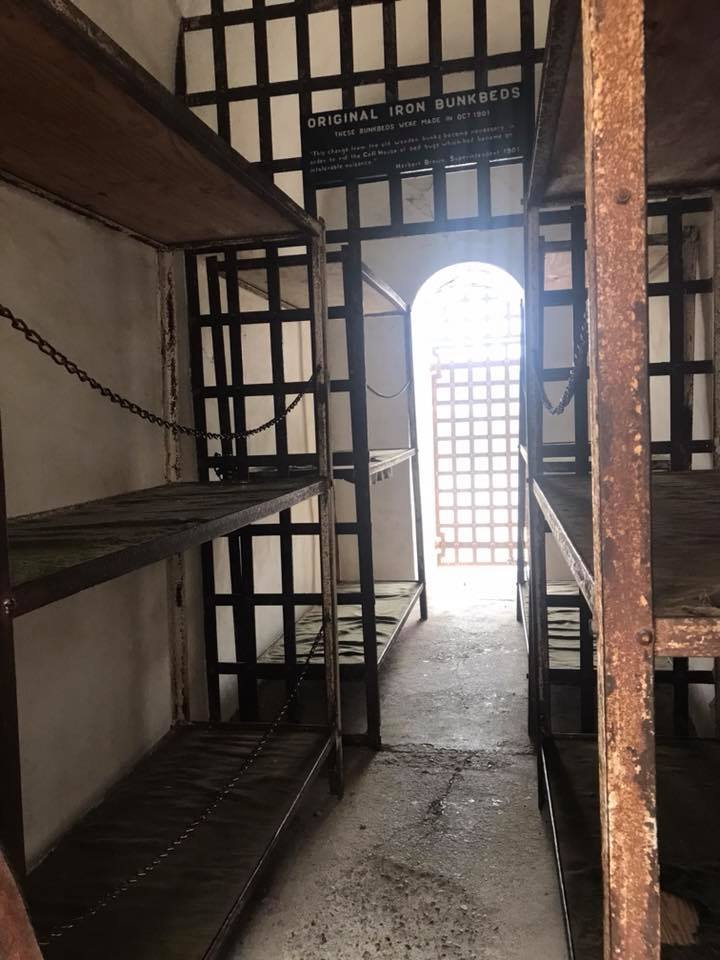
Yuma Territorial Prison cell with steel bunks

The Yuma Territorial Prison was a prison built by prisoners in 1875. The prison opened while Arizona was still a U.S. territory. Conditions in the prison were harsh. Some prisoners had to sleep in steel bunkbeds. Downing was assigned a number, inmate number 1733, just like any other prisoner. On April 11, 1901, he entered the Yuma prison through the sally port which is a secure, controlled entryway to the prison.

Downing's leg became infected and swollen while he was in prison. This was a result of the gunshot injuries he received during a gun battle while riding with the Sam Bass gang back in Texas. The penitentiary physician, Dr. James A. Ketcherside treated the old wound. The doctor suggested that the leg be amputated, but Downing refused to accept the request.

Mrs. Downing was an attractive lady who was in poor health. While her husband was incarcerated, she sold their property in Willcox and used the money to try to gain her husband's freedom from the prison in Yuma. Mrs Downing eventually found herself alone and in need of money. She was hired to work in the home of A.F. Franklin in Tucson. On April 17, 1902, she was hired as a domestic servant by Tucson civic leader and entrepreneur John Ivancovich. The following day, she was found dead in the servant's quarters, this was shortly before her husband's release from prison. A coroner's jury determined that she had died of heart failure and attributed it to worry and nervousness brought on by the conviction and sentence of her husband. Mrs. Downing was buried in the Old City Cemetery in Willcox a.k.a. Willcox Pioneer Cemetery.

Downing served a total of seven years in prison and was finally released for good behavior. According to Thomas H. Rynning, the Yuma prison warden, Downing had been a model prisoner.

== Downing's last stand ==
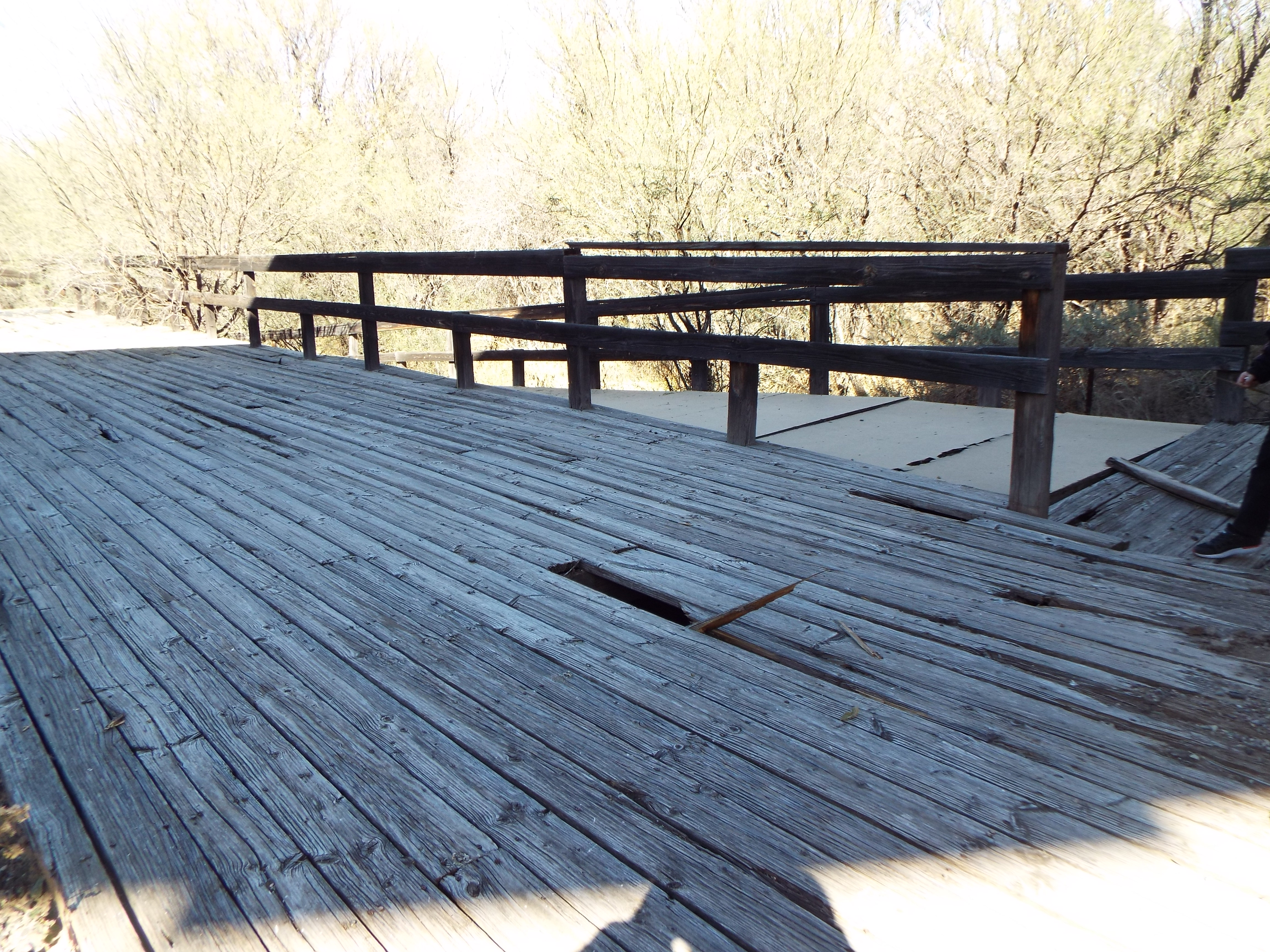
The Fairbank railroad depot ruins (2020)

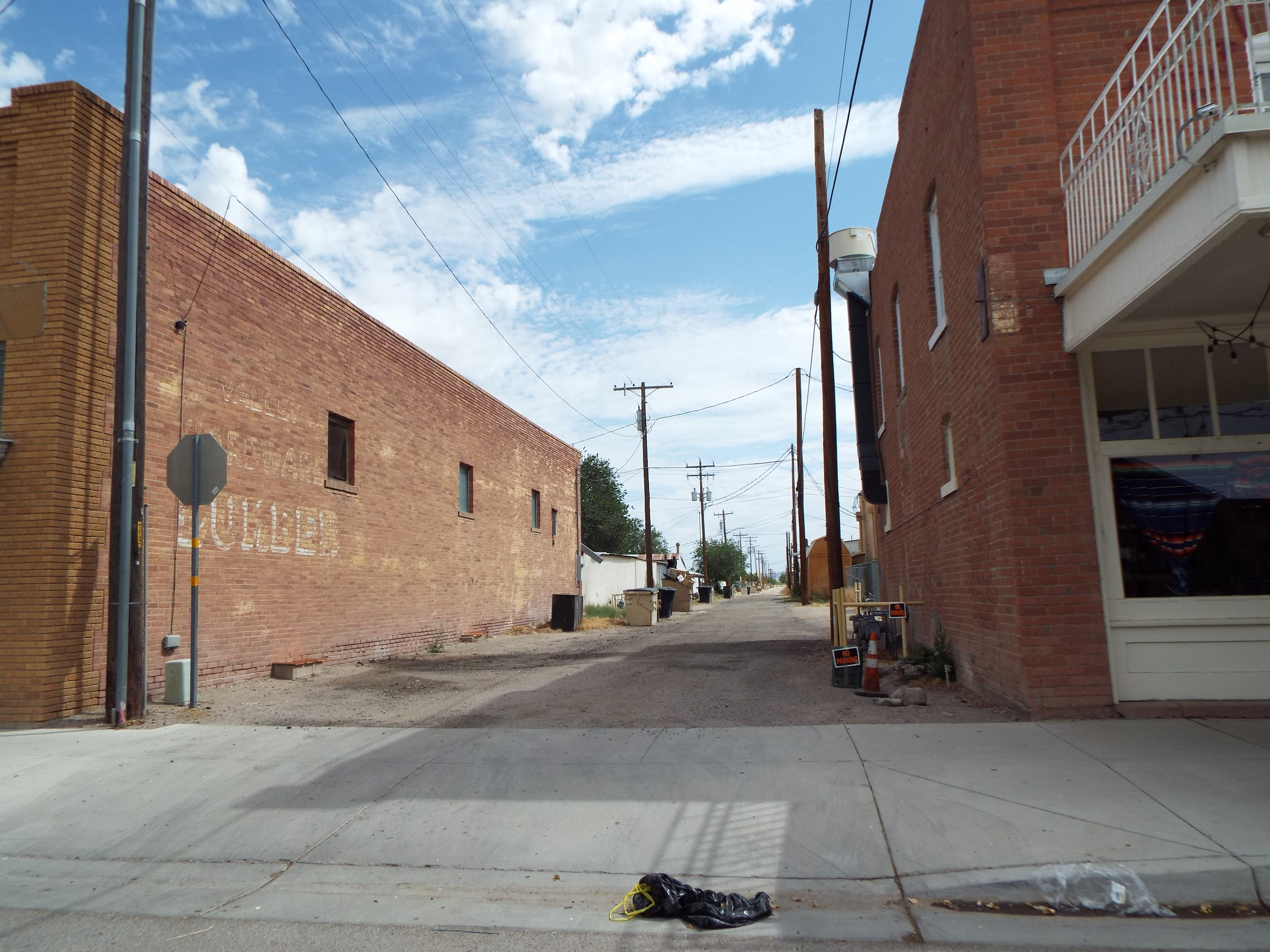
An alley in Willcox

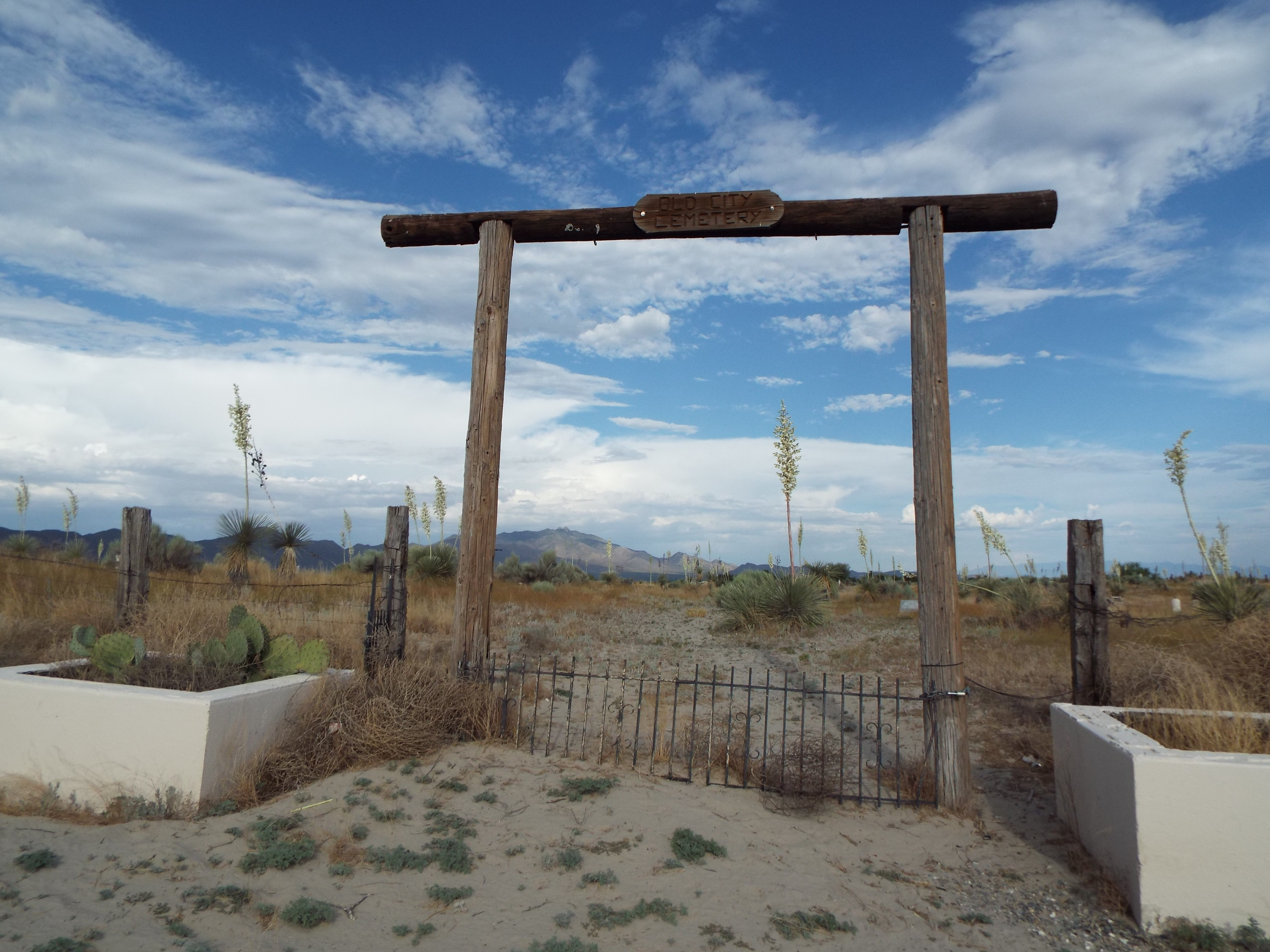
The Old City Cemetery where Bill Downing and his wife are buried

Downing returned to Willcox upon his release from prison and opened a saloon which he named the Free and Easy Saloon on the corner of Maley Street. Willcox at the time had an ordinance which forbade gambling, prostitution and the serving of alcohol to women. Downing was known as one to defy the law and he hired prostitutes who were highly skilled pickpockets. Constable Bud Snow and Ranger Speed arrested Downing for serving women at the Free and Easy. Downing had encountered Arizona Ranger William Slaughter “Billy” Speed before. Speed was among the jurors who acquitted Downing in the 1899, killing of William S. “Slim” Traynor. Despite that they became bitter enemies. Downing pleaded guilty and paid a fifty dollar fine. The very next day he was arrested again, this time he was charged with assaulting a barber. Again he pleaded guilty and paid a fine of ten dollars.

The citizens of Willcox became tired of Downing's defiance of the law and sent a citizens petition to Harry C. Wheeler, the Captain of the Arizona Rangers, requesting protection from the “drunk and unruly” saloon-keeper. Wheeler received word that Downing had threaten to kill any officer who interfered with him. Thus, Wheeler ordered his men to kill Downing on the spot without any hesitation.

Downing had some problems with Cuco Leal, a prostitute who lived in his saloon. He went to the office of Constable Snow to complain and to ask that she be removed from his saloon. At the same time he also warned that if Ranger Speed ever stuck his head inside of the door of his saloon, he would shoot it off. He also stated that he will kill Speed when the time is right.

The following day a saloon customer complained that someone had stolen some of his money. Downing jumped to the conclusion that it was Cuco Leal. He confronted and beat her. She then ran into the Ranchman's Corral Saloon, whose owner was George McKittrick, a rival of Downing. McKittrick told Leal to stay in his saloon and to stay clear of the "Free and Easy" saloon. McKittrick then went to town Justice Page and told him about the Downing-Leal situation. Page issued a warrant for Downing's arrest and handed the warrant to Constable Bud Snow. The constable went to Ranger Speed's house and asked him to join him in presenting the warrant. Speed agreed and recommended that they act in the following morning.

The following morning Downing was in his saloon drinking whiskey. He decided that he would show up in Judge Page's office to discuss the Leal situation. He got up to go and at the same time left his gun behind. When he stepped out the door he noticed that Constable Snow was heading towards the saloon and he ran back inside. He did not notice that Ranger Speed was accompanying the constable. Once they reached the saloon, Constable Snow told Speed to guard the back door of the saloon which was located by an alley. Ranger Speed loaded his .30-40 Winchester and headed towards the alley door.

Downing thought that the constable would come in through the front door and decided to leave the saloon through the back exit. When he went out to the alley he came face-to-face with Ranger Speed. The Ranger ordered him to surrender, but Downing made a gesture as if he was reaching for his gun, forgetting that he had left his weapon in the saloon. The Ranger then raised his Winchester and fired. The bullet from Speed's rifle entered through Downing's right breast, punctured his right lung and exited beneath his right shoulder blade. He died immediately of the wounds which he received.

Arizona Ranger Captain Wheeler made the following remark in regard to the community's reaction to Downing's demise: “This is the first time I have known a dead man to be without a single friend and the first time that I have known a killing to meet absolute general rejoicing in all this town and precinct.” Downing was buried in an unmarked grave in the Old City Cemetery of Willcox a.k.a. Willcox Pioneer Cemetery.

The coroner's jury found that the shot fired by Ranger Speed was in the performance of his duty as an officer of the law and that he was perfectly justified in the act, and, therefore, he was exonerated from all blame in the matter.

== See also ==
- List of historic properties in Willcox, Arizona

=== Arizona pioneers ===
- Mansel Carter
- Henry Garfias
- Winston C. Hackett
- John C. Lincoln
- Paul W. Litchfield
- Joe Mayer
- William John Murphy
- Wing F. Ong
- Levi Ruggles
- Sedona Schnebly
- Michael Sullivan
- Trinidad Swilling
- Ora Rush Weed
- Henry Wickenburg
