= Jack Dunlop =

19th century American outlaw

Three Fingered Jack
- Born: John Patterson Dunlop c.1872 Texas
- Died: February 24, 1900; Tombstone, Arizona Territory
- Other names: John Dunlop, Jess Dunlop, John Patterson
- Occupation(s): Cowboy, Train robber

Jack Dunlop, also known as John Dunlop, Jess Dunlop, John Patterson, and most commonly Three Fingered Jack (c.1872 – February 24, 1900) was an outlaw in the closing days of the Old West, best known for being a train robber. Whether he had just three fingers on one of his hands is not confirmed.

== Background ==
Dunlop was born in Texas and spent most of his mid to late teens as a cowboy. Where he became an outlaw is unknown, but he was arrested after several bank robberies in 1893. Released from prison in 1895, Dunlop joined the "Black Jack" Christian Gang, but by 1898 he was riding with Burt Alvord's Gang, along with George and Louis Owens, Billy Stiles, Bravo Juan Yoas, and Bob Brown. The gang began robbing trains in Arizona, and "Three Fingered Jack" Dunlop quickly became the best known. At midnight on September 9, 1899, the gang robbed a Southern Pacific Express of just over $10,000. The gang had detached the car containing the money, then opened the safe with dynamite. They escaped into the Chiricahua Mountains, where they eluded a posse led by Sheriff Scott White and including George Scarborough.

A few months later, they struck again. On February 15, 1900, the gang robbed a train at the Fairbank, which served Tombstone, Arizona. However, well known lawman Jeff Davis Milton was working as a guard on the train. A gunfight began, resulting in Milton shooting buckshot into Dunlop, and wounding gang member Juan Yoas. Milton was badly wounded in the right arm, but the gang fled anyway.

Dunlop's wound was serious, as he had been hit by eleven pellets from the shotgun, mostly in the stomach area, whereas Yoas had been shot in the butt. The five outlaws soon split up, planning to meet outside of Contention City, Arizona. Dunlop fell from his horse only a few miles from the robbery, and he lay there for fourteen hours before a posse found him. He was taken to Tombstone, where he gave an interview to Tombstone newspaper The Prospector before dying on February 24, 1900. William D. Allison had allegedly killed him.

Dunlop is buried near the graves of Tom McLaury, Frank McLaury, and Billy Clanton, in Tombstone's Boot Hill cemetery.

== See also ==
- Bill Downing
- Fairbank Train Robbery
