= Jack Taylor Gang =

Old West outlaw gang

The Jack Taylor Gang (c. 1884 to 1888) was an outlaw gang of the Old West which operated mostly in Arizona Territory and Mexico.

The gang was first organized by Jack Taylor, a notorious outlaw with expert skills in train robbery. This brought the gang to the attention of later famed Railroad Detective Jeff Milton, and Cochise County, Arizona Sheriff John Slaughter, under whom Milton was at that time working as a Deputy Sheriff. The gang built a reputation for being particularly cruel, and quick to shoot when confronted, and were wanted mainly for the murder of a train engineer in Sonora, and another train robbery in which they killed four passengers. In 1887, Sheriff Slaughter received information that several members of the gang were hiding out at the rural home of Flora Cardenas. However, by the time Slaughter and his posse had reached her house, the gang members, identified as Geronimo Miranda, Manuel Robles, Nieves Deron and Fred Federico, had fled.

Sheriff Slaughter and Jeff Milton tracked them to Contention City, Arizona, to the home of wood cutter Guadeloupe Robles, brother to Manuel Robles. Gang members Nieves Deron and Manuel Robles were hiding there, and without warning Sheriff Slaughter, Milton, and his deputies stormed the house. Guadeloupe Robles was shot dead by Slaughter, while Nieves Deron opened fire on Slaughter and his posse, with one bullet grazing Slaughter's ear lobe. The two gang members fled toward the rocks near the house, exchanging fire with the posse as they ran. Slaughter and two of his deputies shot and killed Deron, and shot and wounded Manuel Robles, who, though wounded, escaped into a thicket. During that same month, gang leader Jack Taylor was captured in Mexico by the Mexican Rurales, and sentenced to life in prison.

The remaining members of the gang, Manuel Robles, Geronimo Miranda and Fred Federico, were still at large. Robles had yet to fully recover from his gunshot wounds suffered in Contention City, and this was being hindered by his having to remain constantly on the move. Robles and Miranda were shot and killed during a gun battle with the Mexican Rurales in the Sierra Madre Occidental mountains later in 1887. On August 12, 1888, gang member Fred Federico mistook Deputy Sheriff Cesario Lucero for Sheriff Slaughter, in a planned ambush. Federico shot and killed Deputy Lucero, and was captured shortly thereafter. He was hanged, and was the last of the Jack Taylor Gang.
