= Burt Alvord =

Lawman and later outlaw of the American Old West (1867-1910)

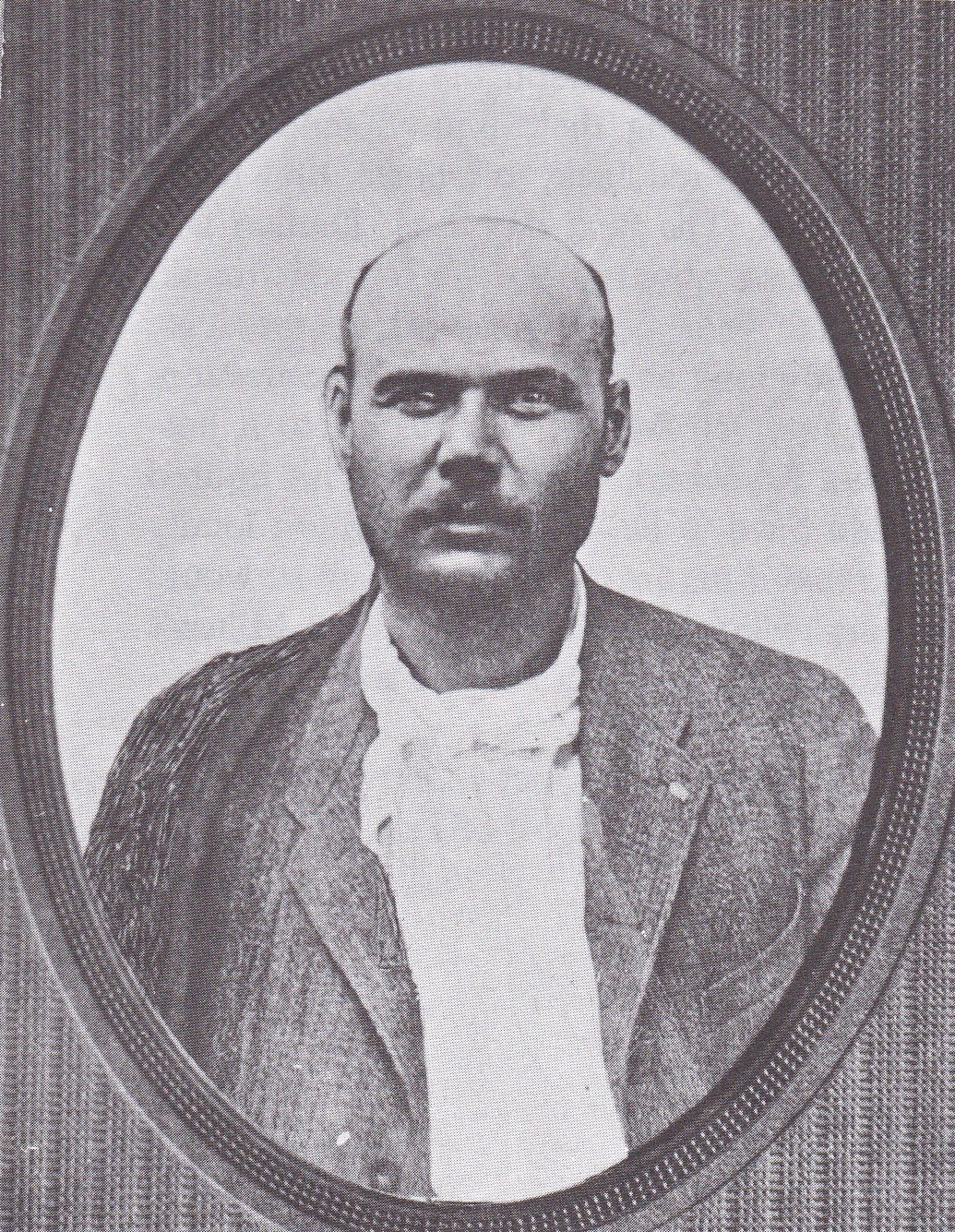
- Born: September 11, 1867; Plumas County, California, U.S.
- Died: c. July 1910 (aged 42); Barbados, British West Indies
- Occupations: Deputy sheriff, outlaw
- Criminal charge: Armed robbery

Albert "Burt" Alvord (September 11, 1867 – c. July 1910) was an American lawman and later outlaw of the Old West. Alvord began his career in law enforcement in 1886 as a deputy under Sheriff John Slaughter in Cochise County, Arizona, but turned to train robbery by the beginning of the 20th century.

== Early life ==
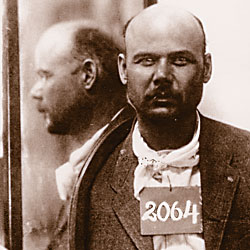
Mugshot of Burt Alvord at the Yuma Territorial Prison in 1904

Albert W. Alvord was born to Charles E. Alvord and his wife Lucy on September 11, 1867, in Plumas County, California. His father, a native of New York, worked as a prospector and mechanic for mining companies, but eventually came to hold public offices such as constable and justice of the peace in several of the places that the family lived. The family moved frequently throughout Burt's childhood, following the mining business from boomtown to boomtown. In 1879, the family settled in Pima County, Arizona Territory, but soon moved to Tombstone in Cochise County.

Alvord's education was informal, but he likely learned much from his father's cases about local disputes. He also spent time working at the O.K. Corral where he got to know the townspeople very well. Claims that Alvord witnessed the famous Gunfight at the O.K. Corral in 1881 are unsubstantiated, though the banditry and lawlessness for which Tombstone was famous would certainly have made an impression on the young Alvord.

== Law-enforcement career ==
Despite Alvord's reputation for frequenting saloons and his participation in several bar altercations, Cochise County Sheriff John Horton Slaughter recruited Alvord as a deputy in 1886. The same year, Alvord's mother died. Alvord served primarily as the muscle behind Slaughter's operations; he made several decisions that revealed his lack of experience and finesse in law enforcement. He was reportedly "not noble, temperate, far seeing, or unselfish". He did assist Slaughter in capturing or killing several rustlers and other outlaws between 1886 and 1889, but his reputation suffered when his alcoholism became increasingly apparent. Alvord continued to frequent saloons and eventually began to associate with gamblers and suspected outlaws. When Slaughter reprimanded him, he quit.

Alvord next worked as a lawman in several towns in the 1890s, including Fairbank, Arizona and Pearce, Arizona. In 1896, Alvord moved to Cochise County, where he married Lola Ochoa, bought a ranch, and settled down. Once again, he became a sheriff's deputy. Two years later, his father died. In late December 1899, Alvord suddenly and inexplicably resigned his post of deputy sheriff.

== Outlawry and last years ==
Almost immediately after turning in his badge, Alvord left his wife and turned to crime. He formed a gang with outlaws Billy Stiles, Bill Downing, and "Three Fingered Jack" Dunlop, men he had once pursued during his career as a law officer. Alvord's gang committed several armed robberies in Cochise County, where he and Stiles were both captured. Somehow, they managed to escape. On February 15, 1900, Dunlop was killed by lawman Jeff Milton during a bungled train robbery in Fairbank, Arizona, and gang recruit Bravo Juan Yoas was wounded. Later that year, Alvord was again captured and taken to Tombstone. Billy Stiles rode to Tombstone and wounded the deputy on duty, allowing Alvord and 24 other prisoners to escape.

In 1902, Alvord assisted Arizona Rangers Captain Burton C. Mossman in capturing the notorious Mexican bandit Augustine Chacon, in exchange for a share of the reward money and a reduced sentence. When Chacon was convicted of murder and hanged at Solomonville, Alvord decided it was wiser not to surrender after all. Alvord and Stiles instead returned to crime, now pursued by the Arizona Rangers. They were captured in December 1903, but again managed to escape. Alvord even made a crude attempt at faking their deaths, using the bodies of two unknown Mexicans. Alvord sent the bodies to Tombstone, claiming they were himself and Stiles. However, an examination quickly showed the dead men were not the two "gringos."

The irritated Arizona Rangers finally pursued the outlaws across the border into Mexico, trapping them near Naco in February 1904. The outlaws resisted, but surrendered after having both been wounded. Alvord spent two years in the Yuma Territorial Prison. Following his release in 1906, he announced his departure by ship to start anew in Central America. He was last seen in 1910 working as a Panama Canal employee. Around that time, he also reportedly worked in railway construction in Brazil. On July 24, 1910, the Bisbee Daily Review newspaper (currently the Sierra Vista Herald) reported, based on information received from an alleged friend of Alvord, that he had recently died of a fever in Barbados.

== In media ==
In 1955, Alvord and Stiles were portrayed by Chris Drake and Paul Sorensen in an episode of the syndicated television series Stories of the Century, starring Jim Davis.

== Legacy ==
Alvord Road in Tucson, Arizona is named for the lawman-turned-outlaw.

== See also ==
- Bill Downing
- Fairbank Train Robbery

== Books ==
- Burton Alvord, lawman and outlaw
- Chaput, Donald (2000). Spawn Gone Wrong – The Odyssey of Burt Alvord: Lawman, Train Robber, Fugitive. Westernlore Press Co.
- Wilson, R. Michael (2005). Legal Executions in the Western Territories, 1847–1911: Arizona, Colorado, Idaho, Kansas, Montana, Nebraska, Nevada, New Mexico, North Dakota, Oklahoma, Oregon, South Dakota, Utah, Washington and Wyoming. McFarland. ISBN 978-0-7864-4825-8.
- Raine, William MacLeod (1905). Pearson's magazine: Carrying Law into the Mesquite. Pearson Publishing Co.
- Sifakis, Carl. Encyclopedia of American Crime, New York, Facts on File Inc., 1982
