= Billy Stiles =

American outlaw (1871–1908)

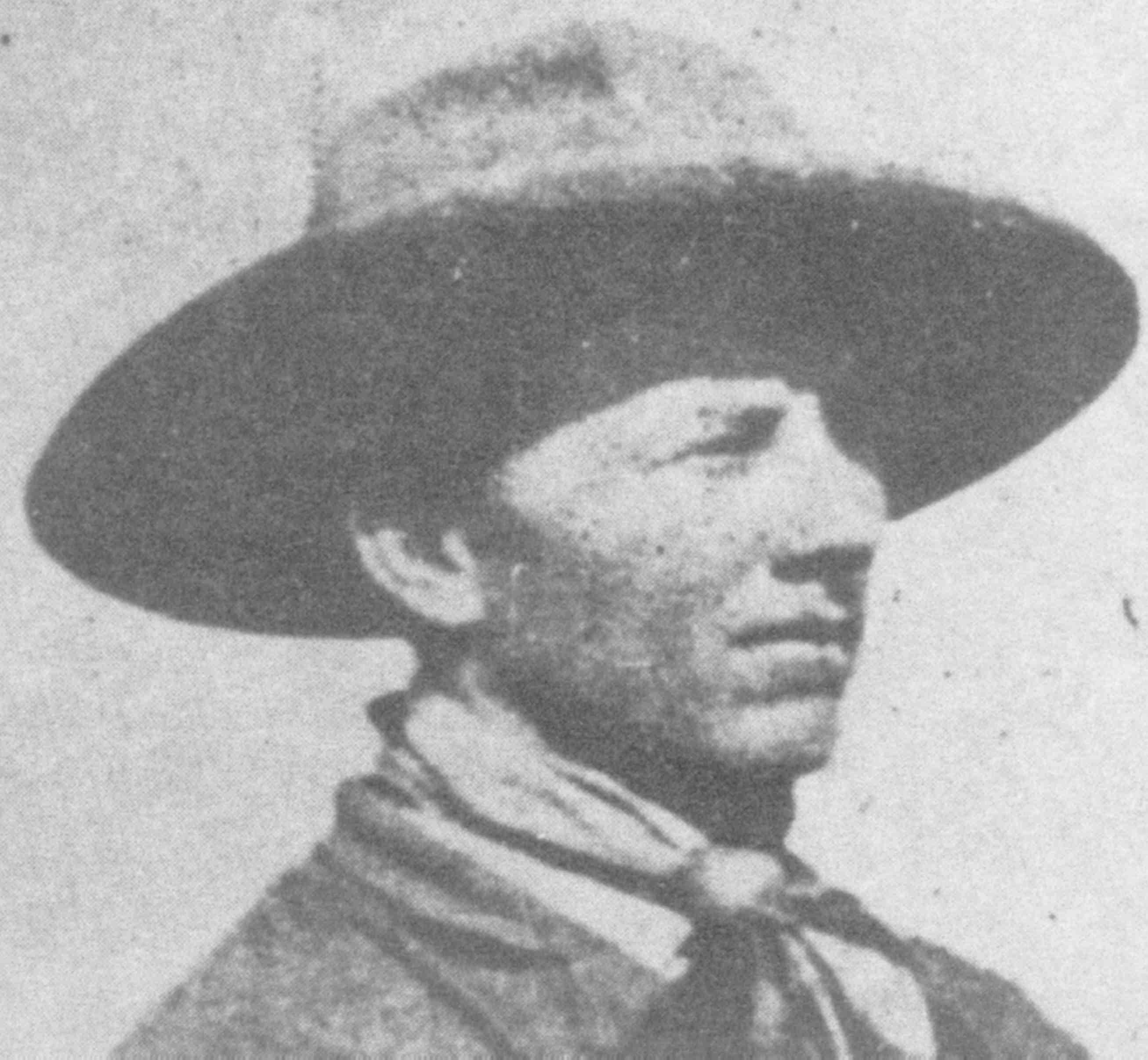
- Born: William Larkin Stiles; September 1871; Casa Grande, Arizona Territory
- Died: December 5, 1908 (aged 37); Humboldt County, Nevada, US
- Other names: William Larkin
- Occupations: Prospector, Cowboy, Deputy sheriff, Train robber

William Larkin Stiles (September 1871 – December 5, 1908), better known as Billy Stiles or William Larkin, was an American outlaw in the Old West who, with partner Burt Alvord, led a small gang of train robbers while serving as a deputy sheriff in Arizona Territory.

== Biography ==
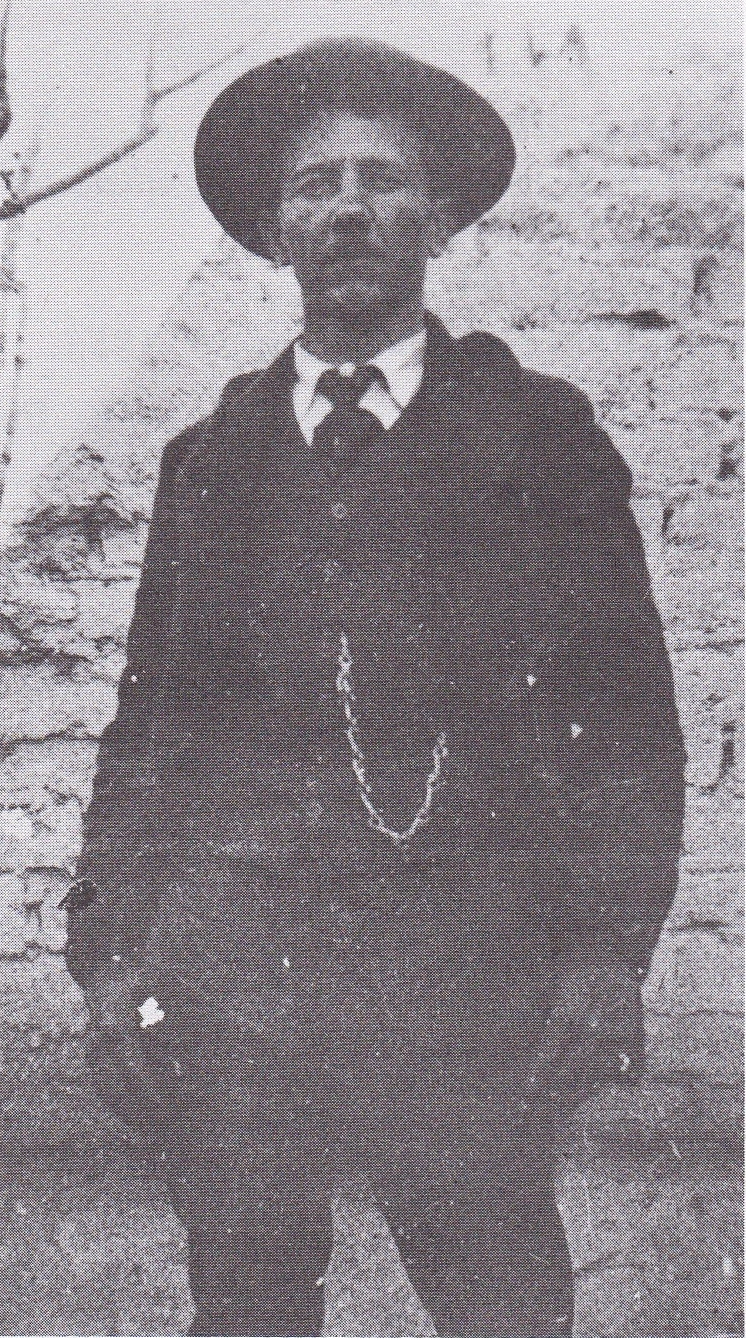
Billy Stiles

Born in Casa Grande, Arizona, Stiles worked as a prospector and ranch hand in the Superstition Mountains. He later became a lawman working under Jeff Milton and John Slaughter, having a reputation as an expert tracker. Eventually meeting Willcox marshal Burt Alvord, the two formed a partnership and were very successful robbing trains in southern Arizona with "Three Fingered" Jack Dunlop, Bravo Juan Yolas, Bob Brown and brothers George and Louis Owens. Under the guise of deputy sheriffs, they were able to interfere with investigations by local authorities.

In 1899, they were apprehended attempting to rob the Southern Pacific Railroad. The two had a minor falling out over the incident with each blaming the other, and Stiles' wife also testified against him in court. Alvord soon broke him out of jail however, tying up the jailer and freeing Stiles from his cell with the keys, and the two disappeared from the area. The gang went in different directions following the February 15, 1900, shootout between five members of the gang, and lawman Jeff Davis Milton, which resulted in Dunlop being killed, and both gang member Bravo Juan Yaos and Milton being wounded. Stiles, however, is alleged to have not been present during that robbery attempt.

In 1902, Alvord and Stiles assisted the Arizona Ranger Burton C. Mossman with the capture of the Mexican bandit Augustine Chacon. After that, Stiles surrendered to Mossman and briefly served in the Arizona Rangers. The roster of Arizona Rangers shows that Stiles was thirty-two when he enlisted. He did, however, turn back to banditry soon after.

Back in Mexico, Alvord and Stiles attempted to fake their own deaths by sending two coffins with their supposed bodies to Tombstone. The ruse was quickly uncovered though and in late 1903 a group of Arizona Rangers entered Mexico to find the two bandits. While successfully capturing Alvord, Stiles was able to escape the country making his way to the Orient, spending considerable time in China and the Philippines. Stiles eventually returned, and became a deputy sheriff in Humboldt County, Nevada under the name William Larkin. On December 5, 1908, he was killed when trying to deliver a court summons. The suspect had opened fire on Stiles as he approached the suspect's barn, hitting him three times. The suspect was arrested, but for unknown reasons was acquitted during the trial.

The following appeared in the December 7, 1908, edition of the Humboldt Star:

A dastardly murder was committed last Saturday afternoon at the Riley ranch on Kings River, ninety miles northwest of Winnemucca. William Larkin, a deputy sheriff, being shot down in cold blood by Charley Barr, former partner of Jim Taylor, the desperado who was killed by Sheriff Lamb in the performance of his duty last summer. The only known motive for the killing of Deputy Sheriff Larkin is revenge, Barr, according to the stories that are told, having sworn to kill those who were in any way connected with the killing of Jim Taylor. Larkin is the first victim, he having been the detective who worked up the case against Taylor last summer, to arrest him and the latter’s death... The murder occurred about 3 o'clock Saturday afternoon. Deputy Sheriff Larkin and John Saval, one of the county’s prominent sheepmen, had arrived at the ranch about an hour before. Larkin being on official business connected with the service of papers in a suit brought by Saval against a sheepman living near the ranch. After having dinner, Larkin and McReynolds started from the house to go to the barn, Saval remaining behind to put on his overshoes. When they were about half way between the ranch house and the barn, Barr, who had evidently been concealed behind an outbuilding, stepped out and commenced shooting. He fired three shots and Larkin fell mortally wounded, but as he fell he drew his revolver and fired one shot at the assassin, but without effect. McReynolds, who was close to Larkin when he fell, started to run, but Barr commanded him to stop and threatened to kill him if he made an offensive move. Barr, gun in hand, then went into the ranch house and took possession of all the guns there. Then he went to the barn, selected the best saddle horse on the ranch, and turned all the other horses out. Mounting the animal, the desperado rode away in the direction of China Creek and the Oregon line, but before going he warned the men on the ranch that he would kill anyone who tried to follow him to leave for town to notify the officers.

== In popular culture ==
In 1955, the parts of Stiles and Alvord were portrayed by Paul Sorensen and Chris Drake, respectively, on an episode of the syndicated television series, Stories of the Century, starring and narrated by Jim Davis.

== See also ==
- Fairbank Train Robbery
