= Fairbank, Arizona =

Ghost town in Cochise County, Arizona

- Ghost town
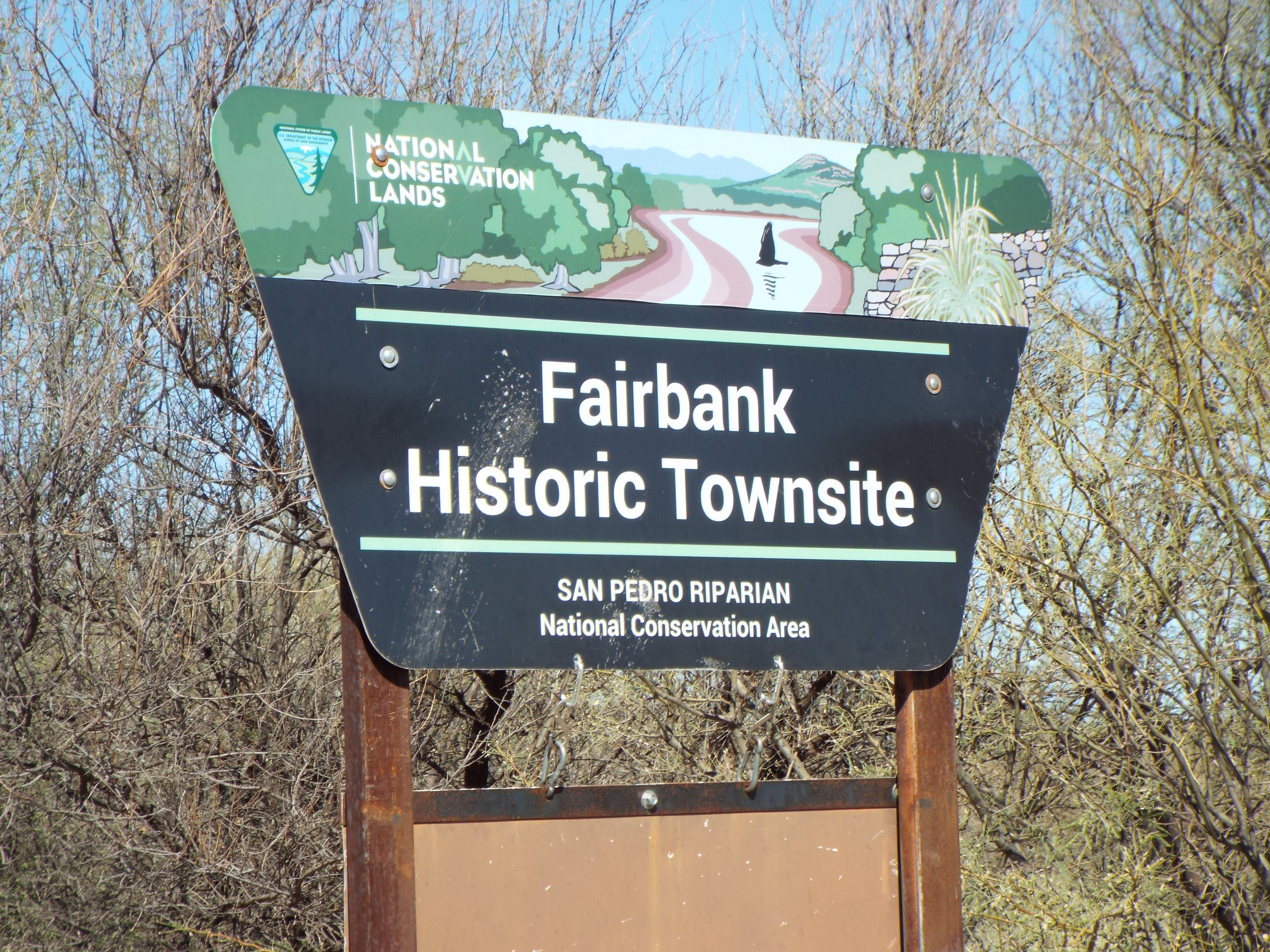
- Fairbank Historic Townsite

- Location within Arizona Location within the United States
- Coordinates: 31°43′23″N 110°11′18″W
- Country: United States
- State: Arizona
- County: Cochise
- Founded: May 16, 1883
- Abandoned: 1970s
- Named after: N.K. Fairbank
- Elevation: 3,858 ft (1,176 m)

Population (2009)
  - Total: 0
- Time zone: UTC-7 (MST (no DST))
- Post Office opened: May 16, 1883
- Post Office closed: 1970s
- GNIS feature ID: 4533

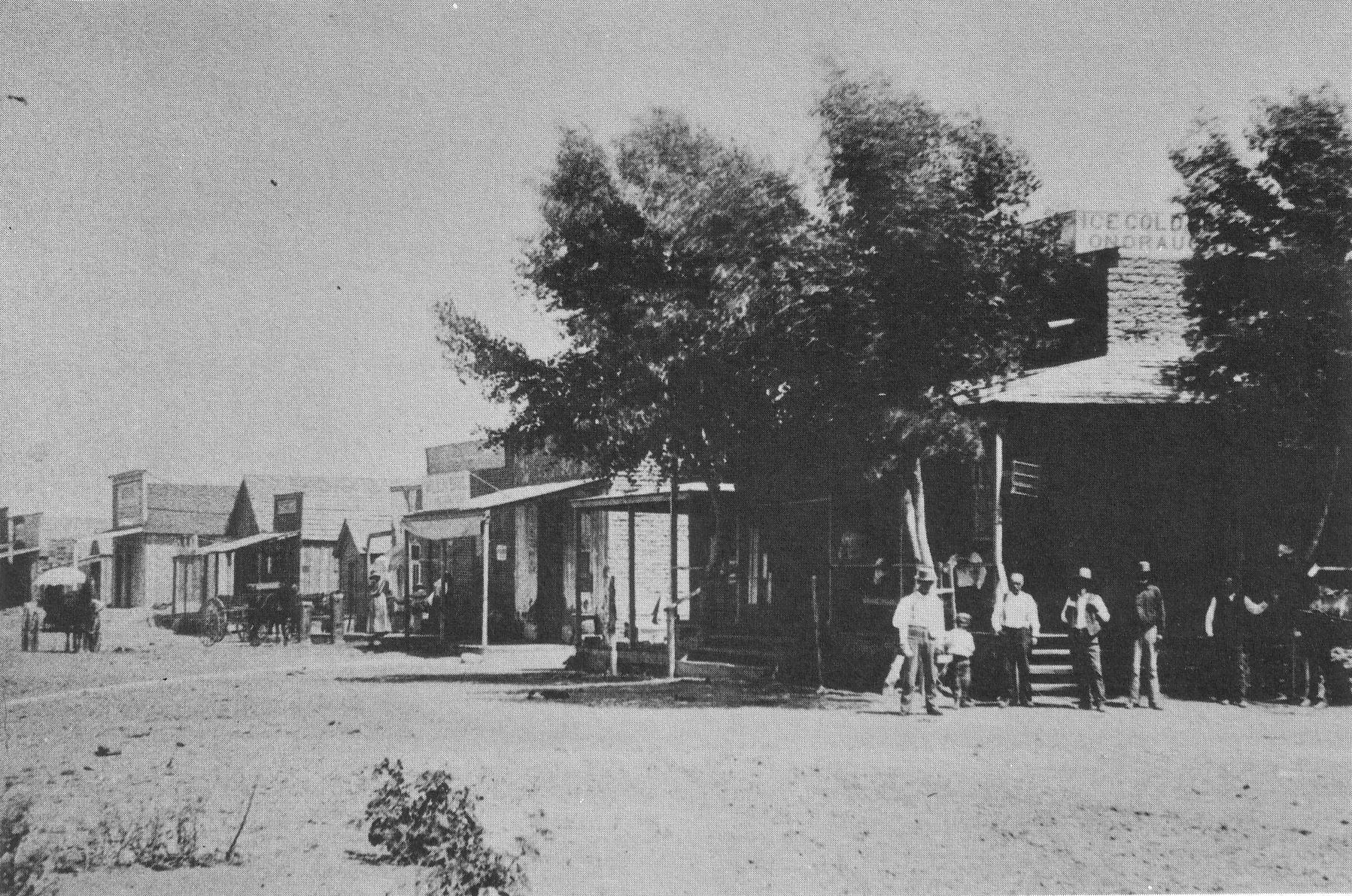
Fairbank, c.1890

Historical population
Year	Pop.	±%
1884	100	—
1890	478	+378.0%
1900	171	−64.2%
1910	225	+31.6%
1920	269	+19.6%
1930	197	−26.8%
1940	192	−2.5%
1950	50	−74.0%
1960	75	+50.0%
1970	0	−100.0%

Fairbank is a ghost town in Cochise County, Arizona, next to the San Pedro River. First settled in 1881, Fairbank was the closest rail stop to nearby Tombstone, which made it an important location in the development of southeastern Arizona. The town was named for Chicago investor Nathaniel Kellogg Fairbank who partially financed the railroad, and was the founder of the Grand Central Mining Company, which had an interest in the silver mines in Tombstone. Today Fairbank is located within the San Pedro Riparian National Conservation Area (San Pedro RNCA).

== History ==
Originally the location of a Native American village known as Santa Cruz de Gaybanipitea in the 18th century, the area was later settled around the time the El Paso and Southwestern Railroad came through in 1881, and developed further when the local railroad station was built in 1882. It was originally known as Junction City, then Kendall, then Fairbanks, and was formally founded as Fairbank on May 16, 1883, on the same day that the local Post Office opened.

Due to its proximity to Tombstone, and the fact that it boasted the nearest railroad station to what was one of the largest cities in the western United States, Fairbank acted as a way point between Tombstone and the rest of the country, bringing supplies into the bustling town, and also acting as the departure point for the ore pulled from Tombstone's silver mines on its way to the mills in Contention City and Charleston. Fairbank was also home to a stage coach station on the Butterfield Overland Mail line which opened in 1885. At its height in the mid-1880s, the town housed approximately 100 residents, and boasted a steam quartz mill, a general store, a butcher shop, a restaurant, a saloon, a Wells Fargo office, the railroad depot, and a stage coach station.

When the Tombstone mines closed after flooding in 1886, Fairbank's prominence declined as the nearby mills shutdown, and the rail depot it offered became increasingly unnecessary. Subsequent droughts drove away area farmers and ranchers, further isolating the town. Fairbank was reprieved from a possible extinction when the railroad linked nearby Bisbee to Fairbank's train depot in 1889, making Fairbank an important leg in the transit of copper mined from the highly productive Copper Queen Mine. However, the flooding of the San Pedro River in September 1890 caused significant property damage, thinning down the population further.

On February 15, 1900, Fairbank was the scene of an attempted train robbery of the express car on the Benson–Nogales train by the Burt Alvord gang. Express Messenger and former lawman Jeff Milton, drove off the bandits despite a serious bullet wound sustained to his arm. The robbery was unsuccessful, and gang member "Three Fingered Jack" Dunlop was mortally wounded, later to die in Tombstone after confessing to the attempted robbery. Among the members of the gang who were arrested was the notorious outlaw Bill Downing.

In 1901, the Mexican land grant on which the town was situated was purchased by the Boquillas Land and Cattle Company who extended the leases on only the commercial building and several residences into the 1970s.

== Geography ==
Fairbank is located east of the San Pedro River, just off of Arizona State Route 82 at 31°43′23″N 110°11′18″W (31.7231456, -110.1884107).

== Demographics ==
Shortly after its founding, the 1884 population estimate for Fairbank was roughly 100 people. US Census figures, taken every ten years, show the town's population peaking in 1890 at 478 residents, then shrinking to 171 by 1900, and then increasing again to a high of 269 in 1920 before entering a steady decline which ended with the abandonment of the town in the 1970s.

== Remnants ==
By the mid-1970s Fairbank was all but deserted. The final remaining residents left when the buildings were deemed unsafe. After that, the post office closed, and the side roads became overgrown and largely impassable. Some years later, in 1986, the former Mexican Land Grant was acquired by the Bureau of Land Management (BLM) and the town was incorporated into the San Pedro Riparian NCA as the "Fairbank Historic Townsite". What remains of the town of Fairbank is now open to the public.

In March 2007, the BLM restoration of the schoolhouse was completed, and the structure was opened to the public as a museum and information center for Fairbank.

== See also ==
- Little Boquillas Ranch
- American Old West
- Boomtown
- History of Arizona
- List of ghost towns in Arizona
- Silver mining in Arizona
