= Jeff Milton =

Old West lawman (1861-1947)

Jefferson Davis Milton
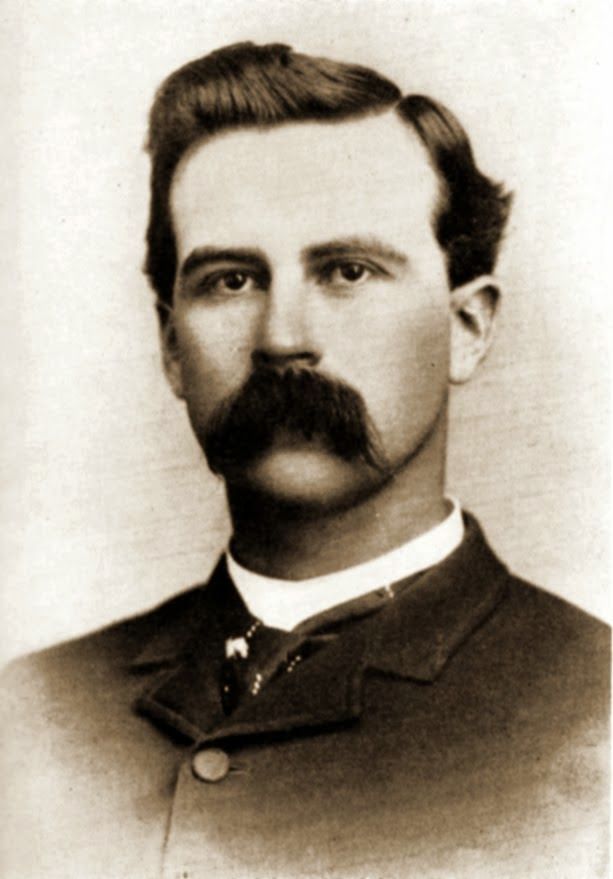
- Born: November 7, 1861; Marianna, Florida, C.S.
- Died: May 7, 1947 (aged 85); Tucson, Arizona, U.S.
- Other name: Colonel Jeff D. Milton
- Occupations: Texas Ranger, Deputy sheriff, Express messenger, first officer in the U.S. Immigration Service; and Colonel, military aid to the governor of Arizona, commissioned by the Governor of the State of Arizona (1937)
- Known for: Father of the United States Border Patrol, frontier lawman
- Parents: John Milton (father); Caroline Howze (mother)
- Relatives: William Hall Milton (nephew)

Jefferson Davis Milton (November 7, 1861 – May 7, 1947) was an American lawman in the Old West and a son of Confederate Governor of Florida John Milton. He was the first officer appointed to the U.S. Immigration Service Border Patrol in 1924.

== Family and early life ==
Milton was born on November 7, 1861, and was reared on the "Sylvania" estate, near Marianna, Florida. Jeff Milton was descended from an American "founding family,” with a preponderance of evidence pointing to a descent from Richard Milton (son of Thomas, and, thus, a nephew to the poet Milton), who was a passenger on the ship, Supply, sister ship to the Mayflower, that landed at Berkeley, Virginia, on 29 January 1620/21. Other ancestors were listed on the earliest passenger lists for the Jamestown Settlement. His great-great-grandfather, John Milton, was an officer in the American Revolution, the first Secretary of State of Georgia, and received electoral college votes in the first U.S. presidential election of 1789. His nephew was a U.S. Senator from Florida, William Hall Milton (1864-1942). After a colorful career throughout the South, his father John Milton (1807-1865) was elected the fifth governor of Florida.

Jeff Milton was three years old on Sunday, April 7, 1865, when the American Civil War ended at Appomattox. At about that time, his father, John Milton, died of a self-inflicted gunshot wound and was buried in the Episcopal cemetery at Marianna. A New York Times article attributed Governor Milton’s sudden death to despondency over the course of the Civil War which ended in his suicide. This conflicted with local reporting from Florida. The West Florida News reported it as a hunting accident. Recent works have investigated the event with some scholars concluding that the death was from an accident as Milton prepared for hunting. Regardless, the traumatic event signaled a different future than had been anticipated for young Jeff.

Reconstruction had a particularly corrosive effect on the surviving former first family of Florida. At age 15 or 16 Jeff Milton considered his prospects and joined his sister in Texas where he worked in her husband's mercantile stores and later as a cowboy. “On July 27, 1880, he appeared at the Texas Rangers headquarters in Austin, armed with a couple of letters of recommendation from prominent citizens. By adding three years to his real age, he became the requisite 21 and was sworn in as a Ranger private.”

== Lawman career ==
After serving with the Rangers for four years, he moved through west Texas and into New Mexico, where he became a Deputy US Marshal in 1884.

=== Capture of Jack Taylor Gang ===
For a time in the 1880s Milton worked under Sheriff John Slaughter in Cochise County, Arizona, during which time the two were involved in several manhunts and shootouts with outlaws. One of their most well-known accomplishments was their pursuit of the Jack Taylor Gang in late 1886 to the middle of 1887. Milton and Slaughter trailed the gang to the home of Flora Cardenas in Mexico. The bandits had been tipped off that the American lawmen were after them and left before Slaughter and Milton could reach the Cardenas' home.

Returning to Arizona, the two lawmen followed the outlaws' trail to Willcox, then to Contention City, where they found gang member Manuel Robles and one of the others asleep. When Slaughter shouted at them to put their hands up a gun battle ensued. Manuel's brother, Guadalupe Robles, joined in but was quickly killed. As Manuel Robles and Nieves Deron ran one of their bullets hit Slaughter's ear. Slaughter's next bullet killed Deron, but Manuel Robles escaped. Jack Taylor was soon arrested in Sonora. Robles, along with Geronimo Miranda, were killed by Mexican police in the Sierra Madre mountain area.

=== U.S. Customs Service ===
Milton joined the U.S. Customs Service in 1887 and was appointed a Customs Mounted Inspector headquartered in Tucson, in the Customs Collection District of El Paso. Milton spent two years with Customs, riding the line from Nogales westward to the Colorado River. As a political appointee, Milton found himself out of a job in 1889, when a new political party took over the reins of federal power.

=== Capture and death of Martin M'Rose ===
On June 21, 1895, Milton who was at that time Chief of Police in El Paso, Texas, accompanied his oft partner, Deputy U.S. Marshal George Scarborough, when Scarborough shot and killed Martin M'Rose, a notorious Texas rustler. M'Rose had been captured by the two lawmen on an outstanding warrant and was killed while being brought back from Mexico. Outlaw, gunman and paramour of Mrs. M'Rose, John Wesley Hardin, claimed that he had paid Scarborough and Milton to kill M'Rose. Milton and Scarborough were arrested, but Hardin later withdrew his comments and the two men were released. M'Rose is buried near John Wesley Hardin and Texas Ranger Ernest St. Leon.

In July 1898, working again with Scarborough, the pair tracked down, shot and captured "Bronco Bill" Walters and his gang at the Double Circle Ranch north of Clifton, AZ., after the gang's failed train robbery attempt in Grants New Mexico, the gang scattered from their hideout, and gang member Bill Johnson was shot and killed by Milton in the process. Johnson's Grave remains in the cemetery at the old Double Circle Ranch headquarters on Eagle Creek.

=== Fairbank train holdup ===
Although the dates, capacities and length of his tenure(s) are not firmly established, Milton was employed for a period of years with the Southern Pacific Railroad and/or Wells Fargo.

On February 15, 1900, Milton substituted on a train for another Express Agent who was sick. In Fairbank, he was handing packages to the station agent when former lawman-turned-outlaw Burt Alvord and five others attempted to rob the express car of its cash. Milton shot outlaw "Three Fingered Jack" Dunlop, badly wounding him. He died days later. Milton also shot and wounded Bravo Juan Yoas. Milton was seriously wounded in his left arm, fracturing it and severing an artery for which he improvised a tourniquet. Before Alvord and his men boarded the car Milton threw the keys to the express car's safe into a pile of packages at the far end of the car. The gang was about to shoot Milton again when the train engineer intervened, saying he was already dead. The robbers were unable to open the safe, escaping with only a few dollars.

The railroad dispatched a special engine and boxcar to transport Milton from Benson to Tucson for treatment. Dr. H. W. Fenner tied the shattered bone together with piano wire. When the wound wouldn't heal, he sent Milton to San Francisco where he could be seen by experts at the Southern Pacific Hospital. They wanted to amputate his arm at the elbow, but he refused and got a ride to his friend Dr. George E. Goodfellow's office. Goodfellow cleaned and treated Milton's wound but told him he would never regain use of the arm. Milton's left arm was permanently disabled and shorter than his right arm.

=== U.S. Bureau of Immigration ===
Milton joined the Bureau of Immigration in 1904 as a Mounted Chinese Inspector charged with enforcement of the Chinese Exclusion Act.

At 62, he became the first officer appointed to the U.S. Immigration Service Border Patrol in 1924, and for the next 8 years he pursued border patrol work "with unbridled enthusiasm".

The Economy Act of 1932 forced the still-active Milton into retirement at age 70. The Sector Chief at El Paso wrote in praise of him: You have come to be regarded "as an institution rather than an individual. No other immigration officer has your value in cultivating for the Service the goodwill and friendship we must have for effective enforcement of the law."

=== Retirement ===
Milton retired to Tombstone, Arizona, and then to Tucson, Arizona, where he lived the remainder of his life. Louis L'Amour wrote in his book Education of a Wandering Man that he met Milton, who bought him breakfast and gave him a ride to Tucson.

=== Quotation ===
“As for myself, I never killed a man who didn’t need killing, and I never shot an animal except for meat.”

=== Recognition ===
On August 15, 1936, the Immigration Service dedicated the "Jeff D. Milton", a new patrol boat in San Francisco harbor. In 1937, "Colonel Milton received his commission and title of colonel from Gov. B.B. Mouer, who made him the life-time military aid of the governor of Arizona."

=== In popular culture ===
Western storyteller Louis L'Amour's autobiography, Education of a Wandering Man: A Memoir, says Milton gave him a ride to Doubtful Canyon in Arizona.

== See also ==
- Fairbank Train Robbery
