= Contention City, Arizona =

- Ghost town
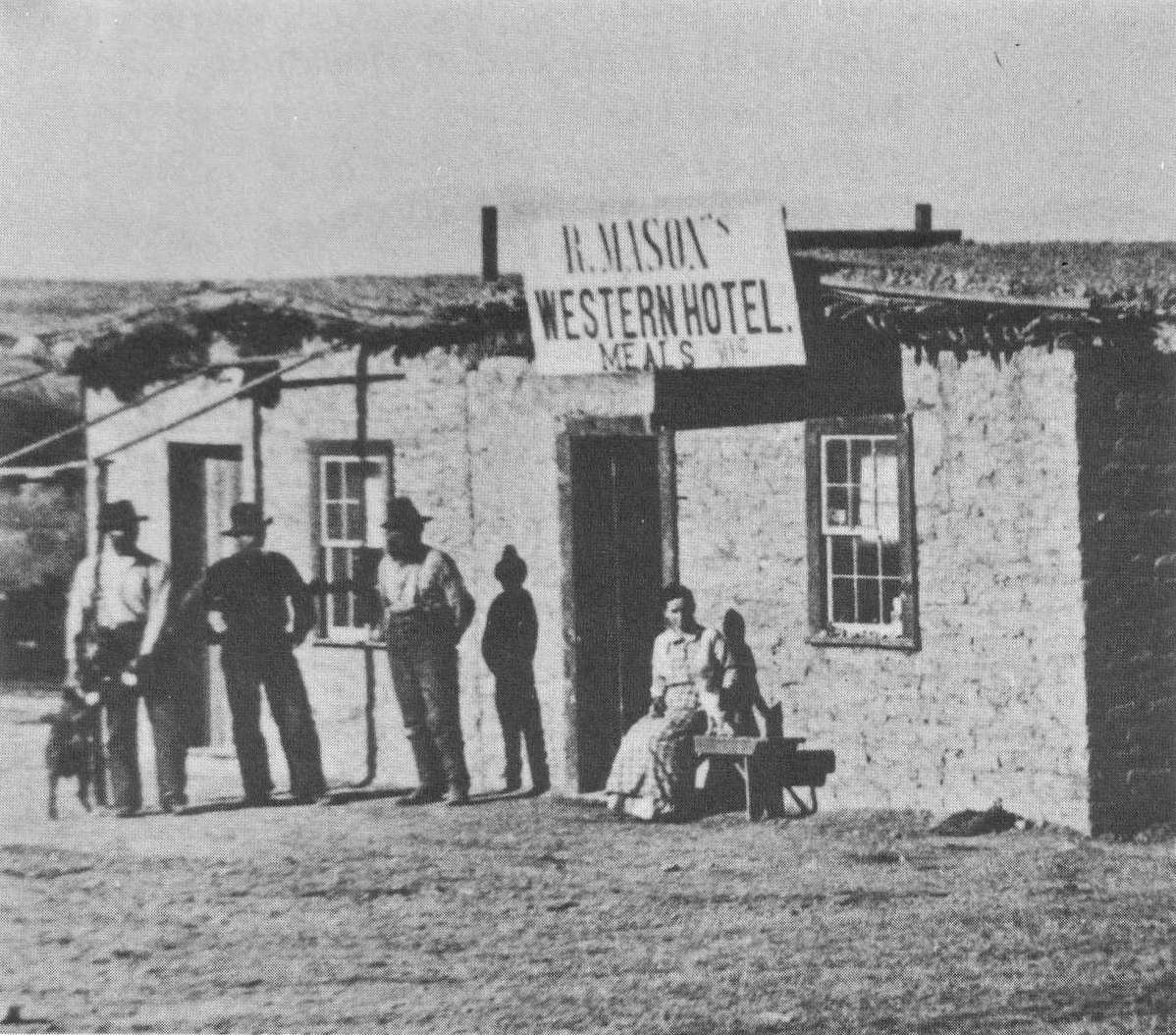
- Mason's Western Hotel in Contention City, 1880.

- Location within Arizona
- Coordinates: 31°46′8″N 110°12′7″W
- Country: United States
- State: Arizona
- County: Cochise
- Founded: 1880
- Abandoned: 1888
- Named after: Contention over ownership of a silver claim
- Elevation: 3,799 ft (1,158 m)

Population (2009)
  - Total: 0
- Time zone: UTC-7 (MST (no DST))
- Post Office opened: April 6, 1880
- Post Office closed: November 26, 1888
- GNIS: 24378

Contention City or Contention is a ghost mining town in Cochise County in the southeastern part of the U.S. state of Arizona. It was occupied from the early 1880s through the late 1880s in what was then known as the Arizona Territory. Only a few foundations now remain of this boomtown which was settled and abandoned with the rise and fall of silver mining in and around the area of Tombstone.

== History ==
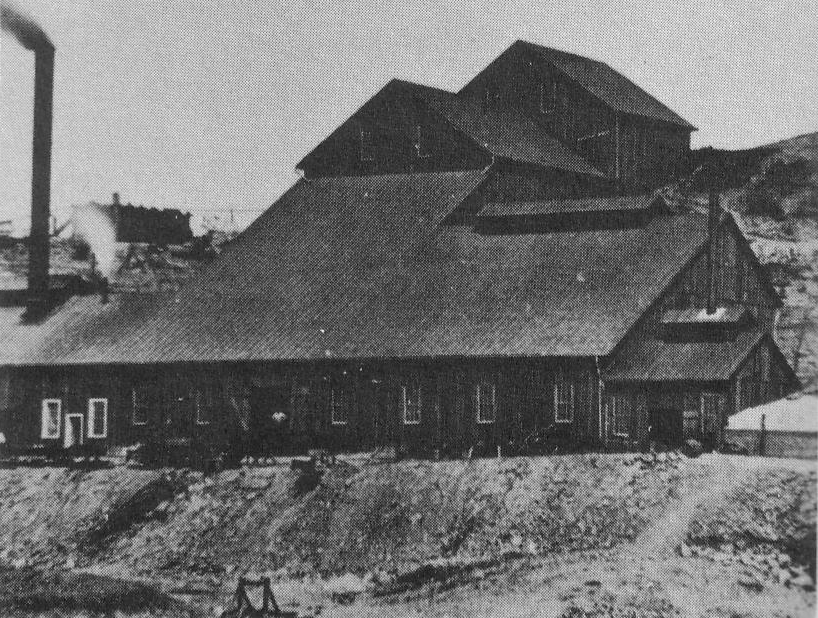
The Contention Mill, circa 1880.

Prospectors Ed Williams and Jack Friday discovered what was to become the Contention and Grand Central mines when their mules broke free from a nearby camp one night. The mules, in search of water, dragged a chain behind them, which allowed Williams and Friday to track the animals the next morning. As they walked, they noticed the gleam of metal where the chain had scraped away the overlying dirt, and upon investigation, they found what would develop into a significant silver lode. The mules were tracked to the nearby camp of well-known prospector Ed Schieffelin, who had been prospecting extensively in the area, and who had staked claims to many of the Tombstone area mines. Unhappy that two competitors had discovered a claim in what he considered to be his territory, Schieffelin disputed the ownership of the claim. Eventually, the claim was split in two, with the upper end going to Williams and Friday, and named the Grand Central Mine, and the lower end going to Schieffelin, and named the Contention Mine after the disputed ownership that earned him the claim.

Contention City, named after Schieffelin's nearby mine, was originally established in 1879 on the bank of the San Pedro River as a milling site for silver mined from the Tombstone area mines including the Contention and Grand Central mines. Mills were constructed along the San Pedro River in Contention City as well as Charleston due to a lack of water needed for refinement in the immediate vicinity of the mines. The two mills in Contention City — Sunset (later renamed the Head Center) and the Contention mill (the Grand Central mill was two miles south of Contention City) — processed or "stamped" the silver ore into fine powder in preparation for smelting.

Once the mills were constructed, the town was surveyed and mapped out in September 1879 by D.T. Smith and John McDermott. The town site was centered between the two mills on the east bank of the river. Lots sold fast, and the town grew quickly to over a hundred people within a few months. The Contention City Post Office was established on April 6, 1880, and at its peak in the mid-1880s, the town was home to John McDermott's saloon, the Western Hotel, a blacksmith, a butcher shop, several general stores, and a Chinese laundry, and was a stop on two stage lines connecting the town to Tombstone and Tucson. In addition, a railroad depot was constructed in 1882 along the just-extended New Mexico and Arizona Railroad, which connected at Benson and eventually ran to Fairbank and then Nogales.

The 1880 United States census placed the population at 150, and the population was estimated to be 200 in 1884, at its likely peak.

=== Notable events ===
In the wake of the Gunfight at the O.K. Corral, Ike Clanton attempted to have Wyatt Earp and Doc Holliday tried in Contention City after a grand jury refused to indict them in Tombstone in the wake of the Spicer Hearing. However, no trial was ever held in Contention City either.

During Tombstone's early rapid growth, Contention served as stopover hotel and livery stable for stagecoach passengers, until March 1882 when the New Mexico and Arizona railroad was extended from Benson to Contention. The day after Morgan Earp's assassination on Sunday, March 18, Deputy U.S. Marshal Wyatt, with assistant deputy James Earp and a group of friends, brought Morgan's body here for transport back to the family home in Colton, California, where Morgan's wife waited to bury him. The next day Wyatt Earp and Doc Holliday left their horses in Contention in 1882 and rented a wagon to transport the wounded Virgil Earp and his wife Allie to the railroad station in Benson.

Contention City is also notable as the scene of a shootout between outlaw members of the Jack Taylor Gang and lawman John Slaughter. When Slaughter was elected sheriff of Cochise County in 1886, four members of the Jack Taylor Gang—Manuel Robles, Geronimo Miranda, Fred Federico, and Nieves Deron—were wanted by both the Mexican Rurales and Arizona law enforcement on charges of robbery and murder. On the run, the men returned to Tombstone to visit relatives. Slaughter heard that the wanted men were in his territory, and set out to apprehend them, but the outlaws were tipped off and fled the town. Slaughter pursued them around the state, eventually learning that they were holed up at the home of Robles' brother in Contention City. When Slaughter and his posse raided the house, he found Robles and Deron asleep. Rather than surrendering, the outlaws came up shooting. Slaughter shot and killed Robles' brother while Deron and Robles ran for cover. Deron kept firing, and one shot clipped the lobe of Slaughter's right ear, the only wound Slaughter would sustain in the gunfight. Slaughter's next shot mortally wounded Deron, who on his deathbed confessed to the crimes he had been charged with. Robles got away, but was later shot and killed by Mexican authorities along with Miranda, spelling the end of the Jack Taylor Gang.

=== Decline ===
Contention's rail depot became superfluous when rail service was extended late in 1882 to Fairbank, 4 miles (6.4 km) south, and thus closer to Tombstone. The discovery of water at Tombstone allowed the erection of mill sites there rendering the San Pedro River mill sites superfluous; when the Contention Mine and the silver mines in Tombstone flooded in 1886 and 1887, after the 1887 Sonora earthquake, the mills were forced to shut down, and Contention City suffered a fatal blow. The population began to leave, and the post office shut down on November 26, 1888. Other than a handful of local ranchers, the town was gone by 1890.

== Remnants ==
Contention City is today part of the San Pedro Riparian National Conservation Area (San Pedro RNCA) maintained by the Bureau of Land Management. All that remains today are scattered adobe walls, cellar holes, rows of fence posts, and the remnants of a small cemetery. Visitors can hike to the townsite on the paths along the San Pedro River.

== Geography ==
Contention City is located on the east bank of the San Pedro River at 31°46′08″N 110°12′07″W (31.7689775, −110.2020211), 4 miles (6.4 km) north of the ghost town of Fairbank.

== Popular culture ==
- The town is the setting for the first chapter of the 1953 western The Bounty Hunters, the first novel by Elmore Leonard. His 1953 story “Three-Ten to Yuma” is set in the town.
- The town is the setting for the finale of the 1957 western 3:10 to Yuma and its 2007 remake.
- Wyatt Earp and his family are shown catching a train at a railway halt signed as "Contention" in the 1994 film Wyatt Earp.
- In the alternate history novel How Few Remain, set in 1881 almost twenty years after winning the War of Secession, Confederate troops from their garrisons in recently-purchased Confederate Sonora and Chihuahua advance to Contention City, which was under the command of Lieutenant Theron Winship (who resigned from the Union army in real life in 1863). Colonel JEB Stuart tricks Winship into believing the Confederates had the city outnumbered and outgunned, convincing Winship to surrender before the ruse is exposed. The victorious Confederates and their indigenous allies raid the city for supplies before taking their prisoners back to Sonora.

== See also ==
- American Old West
- History of Arizona
- Silver mining in Arizona
