= Solomon, Arizona =

CDP in Graham County, Arizona

- Census-designated place
- Location of Solomon in Graham County, Arizona.

- Location within Arizona Location within the United States
- Coordinates: 32°48′49″N 109°37′33″W
- Country: United States
- State: Arizona
- County: Graham

Area
  - Total: 0.21 sq mi (0.54 km^{2})
  - Land: 0.21 sq mi (0.54 km^{2})
  - Water: 0 sq mi (0.00 km^{2})
- Elevation: 2,973 ft (906 m)

Population (2020)
  - Total: 399
  - Density: 1,915.9/sq mi (739.75/km^{2})
- Time zone: UTC-7 (Mountain (MST))
- ZIP code: 85546
- Area code: 928
- GNIS feature ID: 2582868

Solomon is a census-designated place in Graham County, Arizona, United States. Its population was 399 as of the 2020 census. It is part of the Safford Micropolitan Statistical Area.

== History ==
In the early 19th century settlers who fit the modern term Hispanic came to the region. They named the town they founded "Pueblo Viejo" because of the previous Native American settlement, the ruins of which were still visible.

In the 1870s Mormons moved to the region. The Solomon Ward web site says no Mormons moved to Solomon until 1884 They began large scale irrigation. The current name of the town, which was previously known as Solomonville, is for Isadore Elkan Solomon, a German immigrant who came to the town in the 1870s. Solomon was Jewish. He moved to Solomon with his wife and three children, the oldest of whom was three. His wife already had family members in New Mexico. Their first stop in the southwest was in Las Cruces, New Mexico. Mrs. Solomon and the children lived there for four months while I. E. Solomon was searching for a place to start up business, and he eventually settled on the current town of Solomon. When the Solomons came to town there were only five residences in the town. The idea for the name Solomonville was suggested by the local postman, William H. Kirkland.

From the 1880s to about 1910, Solomonville had over 1000 residents. In 1898 the town had a baseball team. From 1873–1915 Solomonville was the seat of Graham County.

In 1906, Frieda Mashbir, the sister of Solomon's wife Anna, was made the postmistress for Solomonville.

In the early 1900s, the town was renamed Solomon.

The Mormons never formed a majority of the town's population. It is the only town in this specific area besides Safford that has not been historically dominated by Mormons. In 1920, the Church of Jesus Christ of Latter-day Saints organized a branch at Solomon.

In 1940, there were 753 inhabitants in Solomon.

In 1979, there were about 250 ward members. By some time prior to September 2007 the ward had over 450 members.

By the 1990s, Solomon itself only had a population of 250

== Demographics ==
Historical population
Census	Pop.	Note	%±
2020	399		—
U.S. Decennial Census

As of the 2010 census Solomon had a population of 426. The ethnic and racial composition of the population was 75.8% Hispanic, 20.9% non-Hispanic white, 0.2% Native American, 0.7% Asian Indian, 0.7% other Asian and 2.8% reporting two or more races.

== Education ==
Solomon has its own school district. The Solomon Unified School District operates one elementary school, serving K–8.

== Notable people ==
- David H. Claridge, Arizona state senator
- Charles Stevens, Apache/Mexican actor

== See also ==
- List of census-designated places in Arizona
