= Allison (surname) =

Origin
- Region of origin: Scotland, England

Other names
- Variant forms: Alison, Alinson, Allinson, McAllister, MacAllister, Ellison

Allison is a surname of English and Scottish origin. It was a patronym, in most cases probably indicating son of Allen, but in other cases possibly from Ellis, Alexander, or the female given name Alice/Alise.

Alison, variant form Alizon, is a surname of French origin.

With the many variants of spelling through history, as well as the likelihood of phonetic spelling changes and variations through time; names such as Alison, Allason, Ellison, Allyson, Alasoune, Allinson and in some cases McAllister have been found to be interchangeable and variants of the different families using the same family name of 'Allison'.

== Origins ==
The surname was first recorded in England in 1248, when a "William Alisun" is recorded in the Documents of the Abbey of Bee in Buckinghamshire. In Scotland, the earliest record dates from 1296, when "Patrick Alissone, Count of Berwick" paid homage to the ruling council of Scotland in the absence of a proclaimed king.

== List of people with the surname ==
=== Alison ===
- Archibald Alison (author) (1757–1839), Scottish priest and essayist
- Sir Archibald Alison, 1st Baronet (1792–1867), historian
- Sir Archibald Alison, 2nd Baronet (1826–1907), British Army officer
- Charles Hugh Alison (1883–1952), British golf course architect
- Dorothy Alison (1925–1992), Australian actress
- Ewen Alison (1852–1945), New Zealand politician
- Francis Alison (1705–1779), minister in Synod of Philadelphia
- Gilbert Alison (born 1933), Australian politician
- James Alison (born 1959), Catholic priest, theologian and author
- James Alison (1862–1932), Scottish architect
- Jane Alison (born 1961), Australian novelist
- Joan Alison (1901–1992), writer
- John R. Alison (1912–2011), American air force general
- Michael Alison (1926–2004), British politician
- Roberta Alison (born 1943), American tennis player
- Thomas Alison (1860–1931), painter
- William Alison (1790–1859), Scottish physician and philanthropist
- William Alison (politician) (1856–1931), Scottish-born Australian politician
- Diezani Alison-Madueke (born 1960), Nigerian politician

=== Allison ===
- Allison family, passengers on board the RMS Titanic
- Abraham K. Allison (1810–1893), American businessman and politician
- Aimee Allison (born 1969), American author, public affairs television host and political activist
- Anne Allison, cultural anthropologist
- Anthony Allison (soccer) (born 1987), Liberian-born American soccer player
- Anthony Clifford Allison (1925–2014), South African medical scientist
- Art Allison (1849–1916), American baseball player
- Aundrae Allison (born 1984), American footballer
- Ben Allison (musician) (born 1966), American jazz, rock bassist/composer
- Ben Allison (cricketer) (born 1999), English cricketer
- Bernard Allison (born 1965), American blues musician
- Bill Allison (actor) (1930–2016), American casino owner and actor
- Bill Allison (baseball) (1850–1887), American baseball player
- Bill Allison (footballer) (1908–1981), English footballer
- Bob Allison (1934–1995), American baseball player
- Bobby Allison (1937–2024), American race car driver
- Brett Allison (born 1968), Australian footballer
- Brian Allison (born 1988), Scottish footballer
- Brooke Allison (born 1986), American pop singer
- C. FitzSimons Allison (born 1927), American bishop and author
- Charles Gary Allison (1938–2008), American screenwriter and film producer
- Chris Allison (born 1961), British record producer
- Chris Allison (police officer) (born 1962), British police officer
- Clay Allison (1840–1887), American cattle rancher and gunfighter
- Clifford Allison (1964–1992), American stock car racing driver
- Dale Allison (born 1955), American theologian
- Darren Allison (born 1968), English record producer, musician, and recording engineer
- Davey Allison (1961–1993), American race car driver
- David Allison (disambiguation)
- Dean Allison (born 1965), Canadian politician
- Donnie Allison (born 1939), American race car driver
- Dorothy Allison (1949–2024), American novelist
- Dorothy Allison (psychic) (1924–1999), American self-proclaimed psychic detective
- Dot Allison (born 1969), Scottish singer/songwriter
- Doug Allison (1846–1916), American baseball player
- Doug Allison (soccer) (born 1962), English footballer and coach
- Elmer Allison (1883–1982), American radical activist and newspaper publisher
- Emery Allison (1894–1977), American politician
- Fran Allison (1907–1989), American television and radio personality
- Fred Allison (1882–1974), American physicist
- Gary Allison (born 1952), German-born American soccer player
- Gene Allison (1934–2004), American R&B singer
- George Allison (1883–1957), English football journalist, broadcaster and manager
- George Allison (boxer) (born 1965), Guyanese boxer
- Glenn Allison (1930–2025), American ten-pin bowler
- Graham T. Allison (born 1940), American political scientist
- Hank Allison (born 1947), American football player
- Harold Allison (1930–2025), Australian politician
- Henry Allison (cricketer) (1828–1881), Australian cricket player
- Herbert M. Allison (1943–2013), American financial expert, former Assistant Secretary of the Treasury for Financial Stability
- Horton Claridge Allison (1846–1926), English pianist, organist and composer
- Humberto Guerra Allison (born 1940), Peruvian physician and scientist
- Jacob Allison (born 1998), Australian footballer
- James Allison Jr. (1772–1854), American lawyer and politician from Pennsylvania
- James Allison (motorsport) (born 1968), British aerodynamicist
- James Allison (theatre) (1831–1890), theatre manager in Australia
- James A. Allison (1872–1928), American businessman and industrialist
- Jason Allison (born 1975), Canadian ice hockey player
- Jay Allison, American radio producer and broadcast journalist
- Jeff Allison (born 1984), American baseball pitcher
- Jennifer Allison (born 1966), American mystery author
- Jeremy Allison (born 1962), computer programmer
- Jerry Allison (1939–2022), American musician, drummer for The Crickets
- Jim Allison (American football) (born 1943), American football player
- Joe Allison (American football) (born 1970), American football player
- John Allison (disambiguation)
- Joseph Allison (disambiguation)
- Kevin Allison (born 1970), American comedic writer and actor
- Krista Allison, American politician
- Kyle Allison (born 1990), Scottish footballer
- Lelah Allison (1893–1956), American educator, folklorist
- Lincoln Allison (born 1946), English writer
- Luther Allison (1939–1997), American blues musician
- Lyn Allison (born 1946), Australian senator
- Mack Allison (1887–1964), American baseball player
- Malcolm Allison (1927–2010), English football player and manager
- Mary Bruins Allison (1903–1994), American physician
- Mary Emma Allison (1917–2010), American librarian and UNICEF fundraiser
- Matt Allison (racing driver) (born 1983), English racing driver
- May Allison (1890–1989), American stage and film actress
- May Allison (athlete) (born 1964), Canadian long-distance runner
- Mike Allison (born 1961), Canadian ice hockey player
- Monica Allison, American actress and voice actor
- Mose Allison (1927–2016), American jazz pianist and singer
- Odis Allison (1949–2022), American basketball player
- Oliver Allison (1908–1989), English missionary bishop
- Olivia Allison (born 1990), British synchronized swimmer
- Peter Allison, Australian writer and African safari guide
- Ray Allison (born 1959), Canadian ice hockey player
- Rebecca Allison (1946–2024), American cardiologist
- Richard Allison (disambiguation)
- Robert Allison (disambiguation)
- Robin Allison, New Zealand architect
- Rodney Allison (born 1956), American football coach
- Samuel King Allison (1900–1965), American physicist
- Scott Allison (born 1972), Canadian ice hockey player
- Stacy Allison (born 1958), American mountaineer, first American woman to climb Mount Everest
- Stephen Allison (born 1971), American politician
- Stub Allison (1892–1961), American football, basketball, and baseball coach
- Susan Allison, American editor-in-chief and vice president at Ace Books
- Susan Louisa Moir Allison (1845–1937), Canadian author and pioneer
- Tom Allison (Australian footballer) (born 1944), Australian footballer
- Tomilea Allison (born 1934), American politician
- Vera Allison (1902–1993), American jeweler and painter
- Wade Allison (born 1941), British physicist
- Wade Allison (ice hockey) (born 1997), Canadian ice hockey player
- Wayne Allison (born 1968), English footballer and coach
- Wick Allison (1948–2020), American magazine publisher and author
- Will Allison (born 1968), American author
- William B. Allison (1829–1908), American politician
- William D. Allison (1861–1923), American lawman
- William Henry Allison (1838–1934), Canadian politician
- Wilmer Allison (1904–1977), American amateur tennis champion
- Young E. Allison (1853–1932), American writer and newspaper editorialist

=== Alyson ===
- Sasha Alyson (born 1952), American writer and businessman

=== Allyson ===
- June Allyson (1917–2006), American film and television actress
- Karrin Allyson (born 1963), American jazz vocalist

== See also ==
- Alison (name)
- Alison baronets
- Allison (disambiguation)
- Allyson
- Alyson
- Ellison
