= William Allison =

William Allison may refer to:

- William Allison (Wisconsin politician) (1827–1882), member of the Wisconsin State Assembly
- William B. Allison (1829–1908), early leader of the Iowa Republican Party
- William D. Allison (1861–1923), American lawman
- William Henry Allison (1838–1934), Canadian politician and school lands commissioner
- William Outis Allison (1849–1924), mayor of Englewood Cliffs, New Jersey
- A. M. Williamson (1858–1933), who wrote under the pen name William Allison
- William Race Allison (1812–1865), Australian politician and landowner

== See also ==
- Bill Allison (disambiguation)
- Will Allison (born 1968), American novelist and editor
- Allison Williams (disambiguation)
