= List of Major League Baseball players (A) =

The following is a list of Major League Baseball players, retired or active. As of the end of the 2018 season, there have been 580 players with a last name that begins with A who have been on a major league roster at some point.

== A ==
Bold indicates an active player.

Name	Debut	Final game	Position	Teams	Ref
David Aardsma	April 6, 2004	August 23, 2015	Pitcher	San Francisco Giants (2004), Chicago Cubs (2006), Chicago White Sox (2007), Boston Red Sox (2008), Seattle Mariners (2009-2010), New York Yankees (2012), New York Mets (2013), Atlanta Braves (2015)	
Hank Aaron	April 13, 1954	October 3, 1976	Right fielder	Milwaukee/Atlanta Braves (1954-1974), Milwaukee Brewers (1975-1976)	
Tommie Aaron	April 10, 1962	September 24, 1971	First baseman/Left fielder	Milwaukee/Atlanta Braves (1962-1971)	
Don Aase	July 26, 1977	October 3, 1990	Pitcher	Boston Red Sox (1977), California Angels (1978-1984), Baltimore Orioles (1985-1988), New York Mets (1989), Los Angeles Dodgers (1990)	
Andy Abad	September 10, 2001	April 13, 2006	First baseman	Oakland Athletics (2001), Boston Red Sox (2003), Cincinnati Reds (2006)	
Fernando Abad	July 28, 2010	July 18, 2023	Pitcher	Houston Astros (2010-2012), Washington Nationals (2013), Oakland Athletics (2014-2015), Minnesota Twins (2016), Boston Red Sox (2016-2017), San Francisco Giants (2019), Baltimore Orioles (2021), Colorado Rockies (2023)	
John Abadie	April 26, 1875	June 10, 1875	First baseman	Philadelphia Centennials (1875), Brooklyn Atlantics (1875)	
Ed Abbaticchio	September 4, 1897	September 15, 1910	Second baseman/Shortstop	Philadelphia Phillies (1897-1898), Boston Beaneaters/Doves (1903-1905, 1910), Pittsburgh Pirates (1907-1910)	
Bert Abbey	June 14, 1892	September 23, 1896	Pitcher	Washington Senators (1892), Chicago Colts (1893-1895), Brooklyn Bridegrooms (1895-1896)	
Charlie Abbey	August 16, 1893	August 19, 1897	Outfielder	Washington Senators (1893-1897)	
**Andrew Abbott**	June 5, 2023		Pitcher	Cincinnati Reds (2023-present)	
**Cory Abbott**	June 5, 2021		Pitcher	Chicago Cubs (2021), Washington Nationals (2022-2023)	
Dan Abbott	April 19, 1890	May 23, 1890	Pitcher	Toledo Maumees (1890)	
Fred Abbott	April 29, 1903	September 20, 1905	Catcher/First baseman	Cleveland Naps (1903-1904), Philadelphia Phillies (1905)	
Glenn Abbott	July 29, 1973	August 8, 1984	Pitcher	Oakland Athletics (1973-1976), Seattle Mariners (1977-1983), Detroit Tigers (1984-1985)	
Jeff Abbott	June 10, 1997	September 29, 2001	Outfielder	Chicago White Sox (1997-2000), Florida Marlins (2001)	
Jim Abbott	April 8, 1989	July 21, 1999	Pitcher	California Angels (1989-1992, 1995-1996), New York Yankees (1993-1994), Chicago White Sox (1995, 1998), Milwaukee Brewers (1999)	
Kurt Abbott	September 8, 1993	April 13, 2001	Shortstop/Second baseman/Left fielder	Oakland Athletics (1993, 1998), Florida Marlins (1994-1997), Colorado Rockies (1998-1999), New York Mets (2000), Atlanta Braves (2001)	
Kyle Abbott	September 10, 1991	August 24, 1996	Pitcher	California Angels (1991, 1996), Philadelphia Phillies (1992, 1995)	
Ody Abbott	September 10, 1910	October 15, 1910	Center fielder	St. Louis Cardinals (1910)	
Paul Abbott	August 21, 1990	August 7, 2004	Pitcher	Minnesota Twins (1990-1992), Cleveland Indians (1993), Seattle Mariners (1998-2002), Kansas City Royals (2003), Tampa Bay Devil Rays (2004), Philadelphia Phillies (2004)	
Al Aber	September 15, 1950	September 11, 1957	Pitcher	Cleveland Indians (1950, 1953), Detroit Tigers (1953–1957), Kansas City Athletics (1957)	
Frank Abercrombie	October 21, 1871	October 21, 1871	Shortstop	Troy Haymakers (1871)	
Reggie Abercrombie	April 4, 2006	September 28, 2008	Center fielder	Florida Marlins (2006-2007), Houston Astros (2008)	
Bill Abernathie	September 27, 1952	September 27, 1952	Pitcher	Cleveland Indians (1952)	
Brent Abernathy	June 25, 2001	September 29, 2005	Second baseman	Tampa Bay Devil Rays (2001-2003), Kansas City Royals (2003), Minnesota Twins (2005)	
Tal Abernathy	September 19, 1942	April 29, 1944	Pitcher	Philadelphia Athletics (1942-1944)	
Ted Abernathy	April 13, 1955	September 30, 1972	Pitcher	Washington Senators (1955-1957, 1960), Cleveland Indians (1963-1964), Chicago Cubs (1965-1966), Atlanta Braves (1966), Cincinnati Reds (1967-1968), Chicago Cubs (1969-1970), St. Louis Cardinals (1970), Kansas City Royals (1970-1972)	
Woody Abernathy	July 28, 1946	April 17, 1947	Pitcher	New York Giants (1946-1947)	
Cliff Aberson	July 18, 1947	May 9, 1949	Left fielder	Chicago Cubs (1947-1949)	
Harry Ables	September 4, 1905	May 5, 1911	Pitcher	St. Louis Browns (1905), Cleveland Naps (1909), New York Highlanders (1911)	
Shawn Abner	September 8, 1987	October 3, 1992	Outfielder	San Diego Padres (1987-1991), California Angels (1991), Chicago White Sox (1992)	
Cal Abrams	April 20, 1949	May 9, 1956	Outfielder	Brooklyn Dodgers (1949-1952), Cincinnati Reds (1952), Pittsburgh Pirates (1953-1954), Baltimore Orioles (1954-1955), Chicago White Sox (1956)	
George Abrams	April 19, 1923	May 4, 1923	Pitcher	Cincinnati Reds (1923)	
Johnny Abrego	September 4, 1985	October 3, 1985	Pitcher	Chicago Cubs (1985)	
Bobby Abreu	September 1, 1996	September 28, 2014	Right Fielder	Houston Astros (1996-1997), Philadelphia Phillies (1998-2006), New York Yankees (2006-2008), Los Angeles Angels of Anaheim (2009-2012), Los Angeles Dodgers (2012), New York Mets (2014)	
Joe Abreu	April 23, 1942	July 11, 1942	Third baseman/Second baseman	Cincinnati Reds (1942)	
**José Abreu**	March 31, 2014		First baseman	Chicago White Sox (2014-2017)	
Juan Abreu	August 29, 2011	September 27, 2011	Pitcher	Houston Astros (2011)	
Tony Abreu	May 22, 2007	July 28, 2014	Second baseman/Third baseman	Los Angeles Dodgers (2007, 2009), Arizona Diamondbacks (2010), Kansas City Royals (2012), San Francisco Giants (2013-2014)	
Winston Abreu	August 6, 2006	July 25, 2009	Pitcher	Baltimore Orioles (2006), Washington Nationals (2007), Tampa Bay Rays (2009), Cleveland Indians (2009)	
Bill Abstein	September 25, 1906	June 2, 1910	First baseman	Pittsburgh Pirates (1906, 1909), St. Louis Browns (1910)	
Jeremy Accardo	May 4, 2005	September 27, 2012	Pitcher	San Francisco Giants (2005-2006), Toronto Blue Jays (2006-2010), Baltimore Orioles (2011), Cleveland Indians (2012), Oakland Athletics (2012)	
José Acevedo	June 19, 2001	September 29, 2005	Pitcher	Cincinnati Reds (2001-2004), Colorado Rockies (2005)	
Juan Acevedo	April 30, 1995	August 5, 2003	Pitcher	Colorado Rockies (1995), New York Mets (1997), St. Louis Cardinals (1998-1999), Milwaukee Brewers (2000), Colorado Rockies (2001), Florida Marlins (2001), Detroit Tigers (2002), New York Yankees (2003), Toronto Blue Jays (2003)	
**Alfredo Aceves**	August 31, 2008		Pitcher	New York Yankees (2008-2010), Boston Red Sox (2011-2013), New York Yankees (2014)	
**A.J. Achter**	September 3, 2014		Pitcher	Minnesota Twins (2014-2015), Los Angeles Angels (2016)	
Jim Acker	April 7, 1983	June 14, 1992	Pitcher	Toronto Blue Jays (1983-1986), Atlanta Braves (1986-1989), Toronto Blue Jays (1989-1991), Seattle Mariners (1992)	
Tom Acker	April 20, 1956	September 20, 1959	Pitcher	Cincinnati Redlegs/Reds (1956-1959)	
**Dustin Ackley**	June 17, 2011		Second baseman/Outfielder	Seattle Mariners (2011-2015), New York Yankees (2015-2016)	
Fritz Ackley	September 21, 1963	May 9, 1964	Pitcher	Chicago White Sox (1963-1964)	
Cy Acosta	June 4, 1972	May 5, 1975	Pitcher	Chicago White Sox (1972-1974), Philadelphia Phillies (1975)	
Ed Acosta	September 7, 1970	October 4, 1972	Pitcher	Pittsburgh Pirates (1970), San Diego Padres (1971-1972)	
José Acosta	July 28, 1920	May 12, 1922	Pitcher	Washington Senators (1920-1921), Chicago White Sox (1922)	
**Manny Acosta**	August 12, 2007	October 3, 2012	Pitcher	Atlanta Braves (2007-2009), New York Mets (2010-2012)	
Merito Acosta	June 15, 1913	September 2, 1918	Outfielder	Washington Senators (1913-1916, 1918), Philadelphia Athletics (1918)	
Mark Acre	May 13, 1994	May 10, 1997	Pitcher	Oakland Athletics (1994-1997)	
Jerry Adair	September 2, 1958	May 3, 1970	Second baseman/Shortstop	Baltimore Orioles (1958-1966), Chicago White Sox (1966-1967), Boston Red Sox (1967-1968), Kansas City Royals (1969-1970)	
Jimmy Adair	August 24, 1931	September 7, 1931	Shortstop	Chicago Cubs (1931)	
**Cristhian Adames**	July 29, 2014		Shortstop/Second baseman	Colorado Rockies (2014-2017)	
Ace Adams	April 15, 1941	April 24, 1946	Pitcher	New York Giants (1941-1946)	
Austin Adams (born 1986)	July 12, 2014	September 27, 2016	Pitcher	Cleveland Indians (2014-2016)	
**Austin Adams (born 1991)**	July 15, 2017		Pitcher	Washington Nationals (2017)	
Babe Adams	April 18, 1906	August 11, 1926	Pitcher	St. Louis Cardinals (1906), Pittsburgh Pirates (1907, 1909-1916, 1918-1926)	
Bert Adams	August 30, 1910	September 28, 1919	Catcher	Cleveland Naps (1910-1912), Philadelphia Phillies (1915-1919)	
Bob Adams (1920s P)	September 22, 1925	September 23, 1925	Pitcher	Boston Red Sox (1925)	
Bob Adams (1930s P)	September 27, 1931	September 17, 1932	Pitcher	Philadelphia Phillies (1931-1932)	
Bob Adams (1B)	July 10, 1977	September 29, 1977	First baseman	Detroit Tigers (1977)	
Bobby Adams	April 16, 1946	April 22, 1959	Second baseman/Third baseman	Cincinnati Redlegs/Reds (1946-1955), Chicago White Sox (1955), Baltimore Orioles (1956), Chicago Cubs (1957-1959)	
Buster Adams	April 27, 1939	September 21, 1947	Outfielder	St. Louis Cardinals (1939, 1943, 1945-1946), Philadelphia Phillies (1943-1945, 1947)	
Dan Adams	May 22, 1914	September 26, 1915	Pitcher	Kansas City Packers (1914-1915)	
David Adams	May 15, 2013	September 29, 2013	Infielder	New York Yankees (2013)	
Dick Adams	May 20, 1947	September 28, 1947	First baseman	Philadelphia Athletics (1947)	
Doug Adams	September 8, 1969	October 1, 1969	Catcher	Chicago White Sox (1969)	
George Adams	June 14, 1879	June 21, 1879	First baseman/Outfielder	Syracuse Stars (1879)	
Glenn Adams	May 4, 1975	October 3, 1982	Outfielder/Designated hitter	San Francisco Giants (1975-1976), Minnesota Twins (1977-1981), Toronto Blue Jays (1982)	
Herb Adams	September 17, 1948	August 30, 1950	Outfielder	Chicago White Sox (1948-1950)	
Jim Adams	April 21, 1890	April 21, 1890	Catcher	St. Louis Browns (1890)	
Joe Adams	April 26, 1902	April 26, 1902	Pitcher	St. Louis Cardinals (1902)	
Karl Adams	April 19, 1914	September 23, 1915	Pitcher	Cincinnati Reds (1914), Chicago Cubs (1915)	
**Lane Adams**	September 1, 2014		Pinch hitter/Outfielder	Kansas City Royals (2014), Atlanta Braves (2017)	
**Matt Adams**	May 20, 2012		First baseman/Pinch hitter	St. Louis Cardinals (2012-2017), Atlanta Braves (2017)	
Mike Adams (LF)	September 10, 1972	July 25, 1978	Left fielder	Minnesota Twins (1972-1973), Chicago Cubs (1976-1977), Oakland Athletics (1978)	
Mike Adams (P)	May 18, 2004	September 18, 2014	Pitcher	Milwaukee Brewers (2004-2006), San Diego Padres (2008-2011), Texas Rangers (2011-2012), Philadelphia Phillies (2013-2014)	
Red Adams	May 5, 1946	July 2, 1946	Pitcher	Chicago Cubs (1946)	
Rick Adams	July 13, 1905	September 29, 1905	Pitcher	Washington Senators (1905)	
Ricky Adams	September 15, 1982	October 5, 1985	Infielder	California Angels (1982-1983), San Francisco Giants (1985)	
Russ Adams	September 3, 2004	June 30, 2009	Infielder	Toronto Blue Jays (2004-2007, 2009)	
Ryan Adams	May 20, 2011	September 19, 2011	Second baseman	Baltimore Orioles (2011)	
Sparky Adams	September 18, 1922	September 30, 1934	Infielder	Chicago Cubs (1922-1927), Pittsburgh Pirates (1928-1929), St. Louis Cardinals (1929-1933), Cincinnati Reds (1933-1934)	
Spencer Adams	May 8, 1923	October 2, 1927	Infielder	Pittsburgh Pirates (1923), Washington Senators (1925), New York Yankees (1926), St. Louis Browns (1927)	
Terry Adams	August 10, 1995	May 23, 2005	Pitcher	Chicago Cubs (1995-1999), Los Angeles Dodgers (2000-2001), Philadelphia Phillies (2002-2003, 2005), Toronto Blue Jays (2004), Boston Red Sox (2004)	
Willie Adams (1910s P)	June 30, 1912	September 6, 1919	Pitcher	St. Louis Browns (1912-1913), Pittsburgh Rebels (1914), Philadelphia Phillies (1918-1919)	
Willie Adams (1990s P)	June 11, 1996	August 14, 1997	Pitcher	Oakland Athletics (1996-1997)	
Joel Adamson	April 10, 1996	April 26, 1998	Pitcher	Florida Marlins (1996), Milwaukee Brewers (1997), Arizona Diamondbacks (1998)	
Mike Adamson	July 1, 1967	May 7, 1969	Pitcher	Baltimore Orioles (1967-1969)	
Joe Adcock	April 23, 1950	October 1, 1966	First baseman/Outfielder	Cincinnati Reds (1950-1952), Milwaukee Brewers (1953-1962), Cleveland Indians (1963), Los Angeles/ California Angels (1964-1966)	
Nathan Adcock	March 31, 2011	July 26, 2015	Pitcher	Kansas City Royals (2011-2012), Texas Rangers (2014), Cincinnati Reds (2015)	
Bob Addis	September 1, 1950	June 12, 1953	Outfielder	Boston Braves (1950-1951), Chicago Cubs (1952-1953), Pittsburgh Pirates (1953)	
Jim Adduci (1B/OF)	September 12, 1983	July 26, 1989	First baseman/Outfielder	St. Louis Cardinals (1983), Milwaukee Brewers (1986, 1988), Philadelphia Phillies (1989)	
**Jim Adduci (OF)**	September 1, 2013		Outfielder	Texas Rangers (2013-2014), Detroit Tigers (2017)	
Bob Addy	May 6, 1871	October 6, 1877	Right fielder/Second baseman	Rockford Forest Citys (1871), Philadelphia Whites (1873, 1875), Boston Red Stockings (1873), Hartford Dark Blues (1874), Chicago White Stockings (1876), Cincinnati Reds (1877)	
Nick Adenhart	May 1, 2008	April 8, 2009	Pitcher	Los Angeles Angels of Anaheim (2008-2009)	
Morrie Aderholt	September 13, 1939	September 30, 1945	Outfielder	Washington Senators (1939-1941), Brooklyn Dodgers (1944-1945), Boston Braves (1945)	
Dewey Adkins	September 19, 1942	October 2, 1949	Pitcher	Washington Senators (1942-1943), Chicago Cubs (1949)	
Dick Adkins	September 19, 1942	September 20, 1942	Shortstop	Philadelphia Athletics (1942)	
Doc Adkins	June 24, 1902	September 29, 1903	Pitcher	Boston Americans (1902), New York Highlanders (1903)	
Grady Adkins	April 13, 1928	October 5, 1929	Pitcher	Chicago White Sox (1928-1929)	
Jon Adkins	August 14, 2003	September 27, 2008	Pitcher	Chicago White Sox (2003-2005), San Diego Padres (2006), New York Mets (2007), Cincinnati Reds (2008)	
Steve Adkins	September 12, 1990	October 3, 1990	Pitcher	New York Yankees (1990)	
**Tim Adleman**	May 1, 2016		Pitcher	Cincinnati Reds (2016-2017)	
Dave Adlesh	May 12, 1963	September 28, 1968	Catcher	Houston Astros (1963-1968)	
**Ehire Adrianza**	September 8, 2013		Shortstop/Second baseman	San Francisco Giants (2013-2016), Minnesota Twins (2017)	
Troy Afenir	September 14, 1987	July 10, 1992	Catcher	Houston Astros (1987), Oakland Athletics (1990-1991), Cincinnati Reds (1992)	
Jeremy Affeldt	April 6, 2002	October 4, 2015	Pitcher	Kansas City Royals (2002-2006), Colorado Rockies (2006-2007), Cincinnati Reds (2008), San Francisco Giants (2009-2015)	
Benny Agbayani	June 17, 1998	September 29, 2002	Left fielder	New York Mets (1998-2001), Colorado Rockies (2002), Boston Red Sox (2002)	
Tommie Agee	September 14, 1962	September 30, 1973	Center fielder	Cleveland Indians (1962-1964), Chicago White Sox (1965-1967), New York Mets (1968-1972), Houston Astros (1973), St. Louis Cardinals (1973)	
Harry Agganis	April 13, 1954	June 2, 1955	First baseman	Boston Red Sox (1954-1955)	
Joe Agler	October 1, 1912	October 2, 1915	First baseman/Outfielder	Washington Senators (1912), Buffalo Buffeds (1914-1915), Baltimore Terrapins (1915)	
Sam Agnew	April 10, 1913	September 28, 1919	Catcher	St. Louis Browns (1913-1915), Boston Red Sox (1916-1918), Washington Senators (1919)	
Juan Agosto	September 7, 1981	June 19, 1993	Pitcher	Chicago White Sox (1981-1986), Minnesota Twins (1986), Houston Astros (1987-1990, 1993), St. Louis Cardinals (1991-1992), Seattle Mariners (1992)	
Luis Aguayo	April 19, 1980	September 30, 1989	Infielder	Philadelphia Phillies (1980-1988), New York Yankees (1988), Cleveland Indians (1989)	
Chris Aguila	June 28, 2004	July 10, 2008	Outfielder/Pinch hitter	Florida Marlins (2004-2006), New York Mets (2008)	
**Jesús Aguilar**	May 15, 2014		First baseman/Pinch hitter	Cleveland Indians (2014-2016), Milwaukee Brewers (2017)	
Rick Aguilera	June 12, 1985	September 6, 2000	Pitcher	New York Mets (1985-1989), Minnesota Twins (1989-1995, 1996-1999), Boston Red Sox (1995), Chicago Cubs (1999-2000)	
Hank Aguirre	September 10, 1955	June 24, 1970	Pitcher	Cleveland Indians (1955-1957), Detroit Tigers (1958-1967), Los Angeles Dodgers (1968), Chicago Cubs (1969-1970)	
Bill Ahearn	June 19, 1880	June 19, 1880	Catcher	Troy Trojans (1880)	
Pat Ahearne	June 14, 1995	June 30, 1995	Pitcher	Detroit Tigers (1995)	
**Nick Ahmed**	June 29, 2014		Shortstop	Arizona Diamondbacks (2014-2017)	
Willie Aikens	May 17, 1977	April 27, 1985	First baseman	California Angels (1977, 1979), Kansas City Royals (1980-1983), Toronto Blue Jays (1984-1985)	
Danny Ainge	May 21, 1979	September 22, 1981	Infielder/Outfielder	Toronto Blue Jays (1979-1981)	
Eddie Ainsmith	August 9, 1910	July 21, 1924	Catcher	Washington Senators (1910-1918), Detroit Tigers (1919-1921), St. Louis Cardinals (1921-1923), Brooklyn Robins (1923), New York Giants (1924)	
Kurt Ainsworth	September 5, 2001	May 14, 2004	Pitcher	San Francisco Giants (2001-2003), Baltimore Orioles (2003-2004)	
Raleigh Aitchison	April 19, 1911	June 20, 1915	Pitcher	Brooklyn Dodgers/Robins (1911, 1914-1915)	
George Aiton	June 29, 1912	July 28, 1912	Left fielder	St. Louis Browns (1912)	
John Ake	May 12, 1884	July 15, 1884	Infielder/Outfielder	Baltimore Orioles (1884)	
Jack Aker	May 3, 1964	September 27, 1974	Pitcher	Kansas City/Oakland Athletics (1964-1968), Seattle Pilots (1969), New York Yankees (1969-1972), Chicago Cubs (1972-1973), Atlanta Braves (1974), New York Mets (1974)	
Darrel Akerfelds	August 1, 1986	July 2, 1991	Pitcher	Oakland Athletics (1986), Cleveland Indians (1987), Texas Rangers (1989), Philadelphia Phillies (1990-1991)	
Bill Akers	September 8, 1929	July 27, 1932	Infielder	Detroit Tigers (1929-1931), Boston Braves (1932)	
Jerry Akers	May 4, 1912	May 25, 1912	Pitcher	Washington Senators (1912)	
Gibson Alba	May 3, 1988	May 8, 1988	Pitcher	St. Louis Cardinals (1988)	
**Jonathan Albaladejo**	September 5, 2007		Pitcher	Washington Nationals (2007), New York Yankees (2008-2010), Arizona Diamondbacks (2012)	
Joe Albanese	July 18, 1958	September 9, 1958	Pitcher	Washington Senators (1958)	
José Alberro	April 27, 1995	August 5, 1997	Pitcher	Texas Rangers (1995-1997)	
**Andrew Albers**	August 6, 2013		Pitcher	Minnesota Twins (2013, 2016), Toronto Blue Jays (2015), Seattle Mariners (2017)	
**Matt Albers**	July 25, 2006		Pitcher	Houston Astros (2006-2007, 2014), Baltimore Orioles (2008-2010), Boston Red Sox (2011-2012), Arizona Diamondbacks (2012), Cleveland Indians (2013), Chicago White Sox (2015-2016), Washington Nationals (2017)	
**Hanser Alberto**	May 29, 2015		Infielder	Texas Rangers (2015-2016)	
Butch Alberts	September 7, 1978	September 29, 1978	Designated hitter/Pinch hitter	Toronto Blue Jays (1978)	
Cy Alberts	September 17, 1910	October 12, 1910	Pitcher	St. Louis Cardinals (1910)	
Gus Alberts	May 1, 1884	September 22, 1891	Third baseman/Shortstop	Pittsburgh Alleghenys (1884), Washington Nationals (1884), Cleveland Blues (1888), Milwaukee Brewers (1891)	
**Ozzie Albies**	August 1, 2017		Second baseman	Atlanta Braves (2017)	
Ed Albosta	September 3, 1941	September 24, 1946	Pitcher	Brooklyn Dodgers (1941), Pittsburgh Pirates (1946)	
Ed Albrecht	October 2, 1949	April 26, 1950	Pitcher	St. Louis Browns (1949-1950)	
Jack Albright	May 19, 1947	July 27, 1947	Shortstop	Philadelphia Phillies (1947)	
**Al Alburquerque**	April 15, 2011		Pitcher	Detroit Tigers (2011-2015), Los Angeles Angels (2016), Kansas City Royals (2017), Chicago White Sox (2017)	
Vic Albury	August 7, 1973	September 26, 1976	Pitcher	Minnesota Twins (1973-1976)	
Santo Alcalá	April 10, 1976	September 25, 1977	Pitcher	Cincinnati Reds (1976-1977), Montreal Expos (1977)	
**Arismendy Alcántara**	July 9, 2014		Centerfielder/Second baseman	Chicago Cubs (2014-2015), Oakland Athletics (2016), Cincinnati Reds (2017)	
Izzy Alcántara	June 25, 2000	August 22, 2002	Outfielder/First baseman	Boston Red Sox (2000-2001), Milwaukee Brewers (2002)	
**Raúl Alcántara**	September 5, 2016		Pitcher	Oakland Athletics (2016-2017)	
**Sandy Alcántara**	September 3, 2017		Pitcher	St. Louis Cardinals (2017)	
**Victor Alcántara**	September 5, 2017		Pitcher	Detroit Tigers (2017)	
Luis Alcaraz	September 13, 1967	June 7, 1970	Second baseman/Third baseman	Los Angeles Dodgers (1967-1968), Kansas City Royals (1969-1970)	
Scotty Alcock	April 19, 1914	August 2, 1914	Third baseman	Chicago White Sox (1914)	
Dale Alderson	September 18, 1943	July 5, 1944	Pitcher	Chicago Cubs (1943-1944)	
Scott Aldred	September 9, 1990	May 29, 2000	Pitcher	Detroit Tigers (1990-1992, 1996), Colorado Rockies (1993), Montreal Expos (1993), Minnesota Twins (1996-1997), Tampa Bay Devil Rays (1998-1999), Philadelphia Phillies (1999-2000)	
Mike Aldrete	May 28, 1986	September 29, 1996	Outfielder/First baseman	San Francisco Giants (1986-1988), Montreal Expos (1989-1990), San Diego Padres (1991), Cleveland Indians (1991), Oakland Athletics (1993-1995), California Angels (1995-1996), New York Yankees (1996)	
Jay Aldrich	June 5, 1987	April 26, 1990	Pitcher	Milwaukee Brewers (1987, 1989), Atlanta Braves (1989), Baltimore Orioles (1990)	
Cory Aldridge	September 5, 2001	July 11, 2010	Outfielder	Atlanta Braves (2001), Los Angeles Angels of Anaheim (2010)	
Vic Aldridge	April 15, 1917	August 29, 1928	Pitcher	Chicago Cubs (1917-1924), Pittsburgh Pirates (1925-1927), New York Giants (1928)	
Chuck Aleno	May 15, 1941	September 23, 1944	Third baseman/First baseman	Cincinnati Reds (1941-1944)	
Bob Alexander	April 11, 1955	September 22, 1957	Pitcher	Baltimore Orioles (1955), Cleveland Indians (1957)	
Dale Alexander	April 16, 1929	September 23, 1933	First baseman	Detroit Tigers (1929-1932), Boston Red Sox (1932-1933)	
Doyle Alexander	June 26, 1971	September 27, 1989	Pitcher	Los Angeles Dodgers (1971), Baltimore Orioles (1972-1976), New York Yankees (1976, 1982-1983), Texas Rangers (1977-1979), Atlanta Braves (1980, 1986-1987), San Francisco Giants (1981), Toronto Blue Jays (1983-1986), Detroit Tigers (1987-1989)	
Gary Alexander	September 12, 1975	September 28, 1981	Catcher/Outfielder	San Francisco Giants (1975-1977), Oakland Athletics (1978), Cleveland Indians (1978-1980), Pittsburgh Pirates (1981)	
Gerald Alexander	September 9, 1990	June 30, 1992	Pitcher	Texas Rangers (1990-1992)	
Grover Cleveland Alexander (Note: Also known as Pete Alexander.)	April 15, 1911	May 28, 1930	Pitcher	Philadelphia Phillies (1911-1917, 1930), Chicago Cubs (1918-1926), St. Louis Cardinals (1926-1929)	
Hugh Alexander	August 15, 1937	September 22, 1937	Pinch hitter/Right fielder	Cleveland Indians (1937)	
Manny Alexander	September 18, 1992	September 28, 2006	Infielder	Baltimore Orioles (1992-1993, 1995-1996), New York Mets (1997), Chicago Cubs (1997-1999), Boston Red Sox (2000), Texas Rangers (2004), San Diego Padres (2005-2006)	
Matt Alexander	August 23, 1973	October 3, 1981	Outfielder/Third baseman	Chicago Cubs (1973-1974), Oakland Athletics (1975-1977), Pittsburgh Pirates (1978-1981)	
Nin Alexander	June 7, 1884	September 3, 1884	Infielder/Center fielder	Kansas City Cowboys (1884), St. Louis Browns (1884)	
**Scott Alexander**	September 2, 2015		Pitcher	Kansas City Royals (2015-2017)	
Walt Alexander	June 21, 1912	September 8, 1917	Catcher	St. Louis Browns (1912-1913, 1915), New York Yankees (1915-1917)	
Jason Alfaro	September 9, 2004	October 1, 2004	Shortstop/Pinch hitter	Houston Astros (2004)	
**Jorge Alfaro**	September 12, 2016		Catcher/First baseman	Philadelphia Phillies (2016-2017)	
Antonio Alfonseca	June 17, 1997	September 23, 2007	Pitcher	Florida Marlins (1997-2001, 2005), Chicago Cubs (2002-2003), Atlanta Braves (2004), Texas Rangers (2006), Philadelphia Phillies (2007)	
Edgardo Alfonzo	April 26, 1995	June 11, 2006	Third baseman/Second baseman	New York Mets (1995-2002), San Francisco Giants (2003-2005), Los Angeles Angels of Anaheim (2006), Toronto Blue Jays (2006)	
Eliézer Alfonzo	June 3, 2006	September 13, 2011	Catcher	San Francisco Giants (2006-2008), San Diego Padres (2009), Seattle Mariners (2010), Colorado Rockies (2011)	
**Anthony Alford**	May 19, 2017		Left fielder/Pinch hitter	Toronto Blue Jays (2017)	
Luis Alicea	April 23, 1988	September 25, 2002	Second baseman/Third baseman	St. Louis Cardinals (1988, 1991-1994, 1996), Boston Red Sox (1995), Anaheim Angels (1997), Texas Rangers (1998-2000), Kansas City Royals (2001-2002)	
Andy Allanson	April 7, 1986	October 2, 1995	Catcher	Cleveland Indians (1986-1989), Detroit Tigers (1991), Milwaukee Brewers (1992), San Francisco Giants (1993), California Angels (1995)	
Brian Allard	August 8, 1979	June 10, 1981	Pitcher	Texas Rangers (1979-1980), Seattle Mariners (1981)	
Bernie Allen	April 10, 1962	September 19, 1973	Second baseman/Third baseman	Minnesota Twins (1962-1966), Washington Senators (1967-1971), New York Yankees (1972-1973), Montreal Expos (1973)	
Bob Allen (OF)	August 20, 1919	September 9, 1919	Centerfielder	Philadelphia Athletics (1919)	
Bob Allen (1930s P)	September 19, 1937	October 2, 1937	Pitcher	Philadelphia Phillies (1937)	
Bob Allen (1960s P)	April 14, 1961	September 27, 1967	Pitcher	Cleveland Indians (1961-1963, 1966-1967)	
Bob Allen (SS)	April 19, 1890	June 1, 1900	Shortstop	Philadelphia Phillies (1890-1894), Boston Beaneaters (1897), Cincinnati Reds (1900)	
Brandon Allen	August 22, 2009	May 9, 2012	First baseman/Left fielder	Arizona Diamondbacks (2009-2011), Oakland Athletics (2011-2012), Tampa Bay Rays (2012)	
Chad Allen	April 6, 1999	June 2, 2005	Left fielder	Minnesota Twins (1999-2001), Cleveland Indians (2002), Florida Marlins (2003), Texas Rangers (2004-2005)	
**Cody Allen**	July 20, 2012		Pitcher	Cleveland Indians (2012-2017)	
Dick Allen	September 3, 1963	June 19, 1977	Infielder/Left fielder	Philadelphia Phillies (1963-1969, 1975-1976), St. Louis Cardinals (1970), Los Angeles Dodgers (1971), Chicago White Sox (1972-1974), Oakland Athletics (1977)	
Dusty Allen	July 1, 2000	October 1, 2000	First baseman/Left fielder	San Diego Padres (2000), Detroit Tigers (2000)	
Ethan Allen	June 13, 1926	June 18, 1938	Outfielder	Cincinnati Reds (1926-1930), New York Giants (1930-1932), St. Louis Cardinals (1933), Philadelphia Phillies (1934-1936), Chicago Cubs (1936), St. Louis Browns (1937-1938)	
Frank Allen	April 24, 1912	September 19, 1917	Pitcher	Brooklyn Superbas/Robins (1912-1914), Pittsburgh Rebels (1914-1915), Boston Braves (1916-1917)	
**Greg Allen**	September 1, 2017		Centerfielder	Cleveland Indians (2017)	
Ham Allen	April 27, 1872	August 9, 1872	Infielder/Outfielder	Middletown Mansfields (1872)	
Hank Allen	September 9, 1966	September 28, 1973	Outfielder/Third baseman	Washington Senators (1966-1970), Milwaukee Brewers (1970), Chicago White Sox (1972-1973)	
Hezekiah Allen	May 16, 1884	May 16, 1884	Catcher	Philadelphia Quakers (1884)	
Horace Allen	June 15, 1919	September 27, 1919	Outfielder	Brooklyn Robins (1919)	
Jack Allen	May 1, 1879	July 17, 1879	Third baseman/Outfielder	Syracuse Stars (1879), Cleveland Blues (1879)	
Jamie Allen	May 1, 1983	September 4, 1983	Third baseman	Seattle Mariners (1983)	
John Allen	June 2, 1914	June 2, 1914	Pitcher	Baltimore Terrapins (1914)	
Johnny Allen	April 19, 1932	September 26, 1944	Pitcher	New York Yankees (1932-1935), Cleveland Indians (1936-1940), St. Louis Browns (1941), Brooklyn Dodgers (1941-1943), New York Giants (1943-1944)	
Kim Allen	September 2, 1981	September 29, 1981	Second baseman/Outfielder	Seattle Mariners (1980-1981)	
Lloyd Allen	September 1, 1969	July 27, 1975	Pitcher	California Angels (1969-1973), Texas Rangers (1973-1974), Chicago White Sox (1974-1975)	
Luke Allen	September 10, 2002	July 17, 2003	Right fielder/Pinch hitter	Los Angeles Dodgers (2002), Colorado Rockies (2003)	
Myron Allen	July 19, 1883	July 1, 1888	Left fielder	New York Gothams (1883), Boston Beaneaters (1886), Cleveland Blues (1887), Kansas City Cowboys (1888)	
Neil Allen	April 15, 1979	September 19, 1989	Pitcher	New York Mets (1979-1983), St. Louis Cardinals (1983-1985), New York Yankees (1985, 1987), Chicago White Sox (1986-1987), Cleveland Indians(1989)	
Nick Allen (catcher)	May 1, 1914	October 2, 1920	Catcher	Buffalo Buffeds (1914-1915), Chicago Cubs (1916), Cincinnati Reds (1918-1920)	
Nick Allen (infielder)	April 19, 1922		Shortstop/Second Base	Oakland Athletics (2022-2023)	
Pete Allen	August 4, 1893	August 4, 1893	Catcher	Cleveland Spiders (1893)	
Rod Allen	April 7, 1983	October 2, 1988	Designated Hitter/Pinch Hitter/Outfielder	Seattle Mariners (1983), Detroit Tigers (1984), Cleveland Indians (1988)	
Ron Allen	August 11, 1972	August 21, 1972	First Baseman and Pinch Hitter	St. Louis Cardinals (1972)	
Sled Allen	May 4, 1910	August 5, 1910	Catcher and First Baseman	St. Louis Browns (1910)	
Gary Allenson	April 8, 1979	August 23, 1985	Catcher	Boston Red Sox (1979-1984), Toronto Blue Jays (1985)	
Jermaine Allensworth	July 23, 1996	May 29, 1999	Centerfielder	Pittsburgh Pirates (1996-1998), Kansas City Royals (1998), New York Mets (1998-1999)	
Gene Alley	September 4, 1963	September 27, 1973	Shortstop/Second Baseman	Pittsburgh Pirates (1963-1973)	
Gair Allie	April 13, 1954	September 26, 1954	Shortstop/Third Baseman	Pittsburgh Pirates (1954)	
Bob Allietta	May 6, 1975	September 28, 1975	Catcher	California Angels (1975)	
Andy Allison	May 7, 1872	October 21, 1872	First Baseman/Rightfielder	Brooklyn Eckfords (1872)	
Art Allison	May 4, 1871	October 5, 1876	Outfielder/First Baseman	Cleveland Forest Citys (1871-1872), Elizabeth Resolutes (1873), Washington Nationals (1875), Hartford Dark Blues (1875), Louisville Grays (1876)	
Bill Allison	May 21, 1872	July 4, 1872	First Baseman/Second Baseman/Outfielder	Brooklyn Eckfords (1872)	
Bob Allison	September 16, 1958	September 29, 1970	Outfielder/First Baseman	Washington Senators/Minnesota Twins (1959-1970)	
Dana Allison	April 12, 1991	May 23, 1991	Pitcher	Oakland Athletics (1991)	
Doug Allison	May 5, 1871	July 13, 1883	Catcher/Rightfielder	Washington Olympics (1871), Troy Haymakers (1872), Brooklyn Eckfords (1872), Elizabeth Resolutes (1873), New York Mutuals (1873-1874), Hartford Dark Blues (1875-1877), Providence Grays (1878-1879), Baltimore Orioles (1883)	
Mack Allison	September 13, 1911	August 20, 1913	Pitcher	St. Louis Browns (1911-1913)	
Milo Allison	September 26, 1913	June 29, 1917	Pinch Hitter/Outfielder	Chicago Cubs (1913-1914), Cleveland Indians (1916-1917)	
Beau Allred	September 7, 1989	June 25, 1991	Outfielder/Pinch Hitter	Cleveland Indians (1989-1991)	
Mel Almada	September 8, 1933	October 1, 1939	Centerfielder	Boston Red Sox (1933-1937), Washington Nationals (1937-1938), St. Louis Browns (1938-1939, Brooklyn Dodgers (1939)	
Armando Almanza	July 29, 1999	July 20, 2005	Left handed relief pitcher	Florida Marlins (1999-2003), Atlanta Braves (2004), Arizona Diamondbacks (2005)	
Carlos Almanzar	September 4, 1997	April 30, 2005	Pitcher	Toronto Blue Jays (1997-1998), San Diego Padres (1999-2000), New York Yankees (2001), Cincinnati Reds (2002), Texas Rangers (2004-2005)	
Rafael Almeida	July 4, 1911	July 18, 1913	Third baseman	Cincinnati Reds	
Bill Almon	September 2, 1974	June 21, 1988	Infielder	San Diego Padres (1974-1979), Montreal Expos (1980), New York Mets (1980), Chicago White Sox (1981-1982), Oakland Athletics (1983-1984), Pittsburgh Pirates (1985-1987), New York Mets (1987), Philadelphia Phillies (1988)	
Edwin Almonte	July 7, 2003	September 10, 2003	Pitcher	New York Mets	
Erick Almonte	September 4, 2001	April 25, 2011	Shortstop	New York Yankees (2001, 2003), Milwaukee Brewers (2011)	
Héctor Almonte	July 26, 1999	September 28, 2003	Pitcher	Florida Marlins (1999), Boston Red Sox (2003), Montreal Expos (2003)	
Luis Aloma	April 19, 1950	August 30, 1953	Pitcher	Chicago White Sox	
Roberto Alomar	April 22, 1988	September 22, 2004	Second baseman	San Diego Padres (1988-1990), Toronto Blue Jays (1991-1995), Baltimore Orioles (1996-1998), Cleveland Indians (1999-2001), New York Mets (2002-2003), Chicago White Sox (2003), Arizona Diamondbacks (2004), Chicago White Sox (2004)	
Sandy Alomar Sr.	September 15, 1964	September 30, 1978	Second baseman	Milwaukee/Atlanta Braves (1964-1966), New York Mets (1967), Chicago White Sox (1967-1969), California Angels (1969-1974), New York Yankees (1974-1976), Texas Rangers (1977-1978)	
Sandy Alomar Jr.	September 30, 1988	September 30, 2007	Right-handed	San Diego Padres (1988-1989), Cleveland Indians (1990-2000), Chicago White Sox (2001-2002), Colorado Rockies (2002), Chicago White Sox (2003-2004), Texas Rangers (2005), Los Angeles Dodgers (2006), Chicago White Sox (2006), New York Mets (2007)	
Yonder Alonso	September 1, 2010	September 29, 2019	First baseman	Cincinnati Reds (2010-2011), San Diego Padres (2012-2015), Oakland Athletics (2016-2017), Seattle Mariners (2017), Cleveland Indians (2018), Chicago White Sox (2019), Colorado Rockies (2019)	
Felipe Alou	June 8, 1958	April 24, 1974	Outfielder, First baseman	San Francisco Giants (1958-1963), Milwaukee/Atlanta Braves (1964-1969), Oakland Athletics (1970-1971), New York Yankees (1971-1973), Montreal Expos (1973), Milwaukee Brewers (1974)	
Jesús Alou	September 10, 1963	September 29, 1979	Outfielder	San Francisco Giants (1963-1968), Houston Astros (1969-1973), Oakland Athletics (1973-1974), New York Mets (1975), Houston Astros (1978-1979)	
Matty Alou	September 26, 1960	June 21, 1974	Left-handed	San Francisco Giants (1960-1965), Pittsburgh Pirates (1966-1970), St. Louis Cardinals (1971-1972), Oakland Athletics (1972), New York Yankees (1973), St. Louis Cardinals (1973), San Diego Padres (1974)	
Moisés Alou	July 26, 1990	June 10, 2008	Outfielder	Pittsburgh Pirates (1990), Montreal Expos (1990, 1992-1996), Florida Marlins (1997), Houston Astros (1998, 2000-2001), Chicago Cubs (2002-2004), San Francisco Giants (2005-2006), New York Mets (2007-2008)	
Whitey Alperman	April 13, 1906	October 2, 1909	Second baseman	Brooklyn Superbas	
Dell Alston	May 17, 1977	October 4, 1980	Outfielder	New York Yankees (1977-1978), Oakland Athletics (1978), Cleveland Indians (1979-1980)	
Garvin Alston	June 6, 1996	June 18, 1996	Pitcher	Colorado Rockies	
Tom Alston	April 13, 1954	September 29, 1957	First baseman	St. Louis Cardinals	
Walter Alston	September 27, 1936	September 27, 1936	Right-handed	St. Louis Cardinals	
Porfi Altamirano	May 9, 1982	June 8, 1984	Middle relief pitcher	Philadelphia Phillies (1982-1983), Chicago Cubs (1984)	
Ernie Alten	April 17, 1920	June 30, 1920	Pitcher	Detroit Tigers	
Jesse Altenburg	September 19, 1916	May 17, 1917	Right-handed	Pittsburgh Pirates	
Dave Altizer	May 29, 1906	July 10, 1911	Shortstop	Washington Senators (1906-1908), Cleveland Naps (1908), Chicago White Sox (1909), Cincinnati Reds (1910-1911)	
George Altman	April 11, 1959	October 1, 1967	Outfielder	Chicago Cubs (1959-1962), St. Louis Cardinals (1963), New York Mets (1964), Chicago Cubs (1965-1967)	
Joe Altobelli	April 14, 1955	October 1, 1961	First baseman/outfielder	Cleveland Indians (1955, 1957), Minnesota Twins (1961)	
Nick Altrock	July 14, 1898	October 1, 1933	Player	Louisville Colonels (1898), Boston Americans (1902-1903), Chicago White Sox (1903-1909), Washington Senators (1909, 1912-1915, 1918-1919, 1924, 1929, 1931, 1933)	
**Jose Altuve**	July 20, 2011		Second baseman	Houston Astros	
George Alusik	September 11, 1958	October 2, 1964	Right-handed	Detroit Tigers (1958, 1961-1962), Kansas City Athletics (1962-1964)	
Luis Alvarado	September 13, 1968	April 30, 1977	Infielder	Boston Red Sox (1968-1970), Chicago White Sox (1971-1974), St. Louis Cardinals (1974), Cleveland Indians (1974), St. Louis Cardinals (1976), New York Mets (1977), Detroit Tigers (1977)	
Abe Alvarez	July 22, 2004	May 21, 2006	Pitcher	Boston Red Sox	
Clemente Álvarez	September 19, 2000	October 1, 2000	Catcher	Philadelphia Phillies	
Gabe Alvarez	June 22, 1998	September 30, 2000	Third baseman	Detroit Tigers (1998-2000), San Diego Padres (2000)	
**Henderson Álvarez**	August 20, 2011		Pitcher	Toronto Blue Jays (2011-2012), Miami Marlins (2013-2015), Philadelphia Phillies (2017)	
Jose Alvarez	October 1, 1981	June 24, 1989	Pitcher	Atlanta Braves (1981-1982, 1988-1989)	
Juan Alvarez	September 1, 1999	June 3, 2003	Relief pitcher	Anaheim Angels (1999-2000), Texas Rangers (2002), Florida Marlins (2003)	
Orlando Álvarez	September 1, 1973	June 18, 1976	Right-handed	Los Angeles Dodgers (1973-1975), California Angels (1976)	
Ossie Álvarez	April 19, 1958	April 26, 1959	Shortstop	Washington Senators (1958), Detroit Tigers (1959)	
Pedro Álvarez	June 16, 2010	June 15, 2018	Third baseman	Pittsburgh Pirates (2010-2015), Baltimore Orioles (2016-2018)	
Rogelio Álvarez	September 18, 1960	September 28, 1962	First baseman	Cincinnati Reds (1960, 1962)	
Tavo Álvarez	August 21, 1995	September 29, 1996	Pitcher	Montreal Expos	
Tony Álvarez	September 4, 2002	October 3, 2004	Outfielder	Pittsburgh Pirates (2002, 2004)	
Víctor Álvarez	July 30, 2002	August 26, 2003	Pitcher	Los Angeles Dodgers	
Wilson Álvarez	July 24, 1989	September 28, 2005	Pitcher	Texas Rangers (1989), Chicago White Sox (1991-1997), San Francisco Giants (1997), Tampa Bay Devil Rays (1998-1999, 2002), Los Angeles Dodgers (2003-2005)	
**Yordan Alvarez**	June 9, 2019		Outfielder/Designated hitter	Houston Astros	
Max Alvis	September 11, 1962	September 27, 1970	Third baseman	Cleveland Indians (1962-1969), Milwaukee Brewers (1970)	
Billy Alvord	April 30, 1885	July 8, 1893	Third baseman	St. Louis Maroons (1885), Kansas City Cowboys (1889), Toledo Maumees (1890), Cleveland Spiders (1891), Washington Statesman (1891), Cleveland Spiders (1893)	
Brant Alyea	September 11, 1965	July 20, 1972	Outfielder	Washington Senators (1965, 1968-1969), Minnesota Twins (1970-1971), Oakland Athletics (1972), St. Louis Cardinals (1972)	
Joey Amalfitano	May 3, 1954	June 27, 1967	Second/Third baseman	New York/San Francisco Giants (1954-1955, 1960-1961, 1963), Houston Colt 45's (1962), Chicago Cubs (1964-1967)	
Rich Amaral	May 27, 1991	June 14, 2000	Utility player	Seattle Mariners (1991-1998), Baltimore Orioles (1999-2000)	
**Alexi Amarista**	April 26, 2011		Utility player	Los Angeles Angels of Anaheim (2011-2012), San Diego Padres (2012-2016), Colorado Rockies (2017)	
Rubén Amaro Sr.	June 29, 1958	August 27, 1969	Shortstop	St. Louis Cardinals (1958), Philadelphia Phillies (1960-1965), New York Yankees (1966-1968), California Angels (1969)	
Rubén Amaro Jr.	June 8, 1991	September 27, 1998	Outfielder	California Angels (1991), Philadelphia Phillies (1992-1993), Cleveland Indians (1994-1995), Philadelphia Phillies (1996-1998)	
Wayne Ambler	June 4, 1937	September 4, 1939	Second baseman/ Shortstop	Philadelphia Athletics (1937-1939)	
Chip Ambres	July 20, 2005	September 28, 2008	Outfielder	Kansas City Royals (2005), New York Mets (2007), San Diego Padres (2008)	
Héctor Ambriz	April 30, 2010	May 7, 2014	Pitcher	Cleveland Indians (2010), Houston Astros (2012-2013), San Diego Padres (2014)	
Ed Amelung	July 28, 1984	July 7, 1986	Outfielder	Los Angeles Dodgers (1984, 1986)	
Red Ames	September 14, 1903	September 15, 1919	Pitcher	New York Giants (1903-1913), Cincinnati Reds (1913-1915), St. Louis Cardinals (1915-1919), Philadelphia Phillies (1919)	
Alfredo Amézaga	May 24, 2002	September 4, 2011	Center fielder/Infielder	Anaheim Angels (2002-2004), Colorado Rockies (2005), Pittsburgh Pirates (2005), Florida Marlins (2006-2008), Colorado Rockies (2011), Florida Marlins (2011)	
Doc Amole	August 19, 1897	May 17, 1898	Pitcher	Baltimore Orioles (1897), Washington Senators (1898)	
Vicente Amor	August 16, 1955	August 26, 1957	Pitcher	Chicago Cubs (1955), Cincinnati Redlegs (1957)	
Sandy Amorós	August 22, 1952	October 2, 1960	Left fielder	Brooklyn/Los Angeles Dodgers (1952-1960), Detroit Tigers (1960)	
Walter Ancker	September 3, 1915	September 14, 1915	Pitcher	Philadelphia Athletics	
Larry Andersen	September 5, 1975	July 31, 1994	Pitcher	Cleveland Indians (1975, 1977, 1979), Seattle Mariners (1981-1982), Philadelphia Athletics (1983-1986), Houston Astros (1986-1990), Boston Red Sox (1990), San Diego Padres (1991-1992), Philadelphia Phillies (1993-1994)	
Alf Anderson	April 20, 1941	April 21, 1946	Shortstop	Pittsburgh Pirates (1941-1942, 1946)	
Allan Anderson	June 11, 1986	October 6, 1991	Pitcher	Minnesota Twins	
Andy Anderson	May 10, 1948	October 2, 1949	Infielder	St. Louis Browns	
Bill Anderson (1880s P)	August 12, 1889	August 12, 1889	Pitcher	Louisville Colonels (1889)	
Bill Anderson (1920s P)	September 10, 1925	September 17, 1925	Pitcher	Boston Braves	
Bob Anderson	July 31, 1957	September 25, 1963	Pitcher	Chicago Cubs (1957-1962), Detroit Tigers (1963)	
Brady Anderson	April 4, 1988	May 20, 2003	Outfielder	Boston Red Sox (1988), Baltimore Orioles (1988-2001), Cleveland Indians (2002)	
**Brett Anderson**	April 10, 2009		Pitcher	Oakland Athletics (2009-2013), Colorado Rockies (2014), Los Angeles Dodgers (2015-2016), Chicago Cubs (2017), Toronto Blue Jays (2017), Oakland Athletics (2018-2019), Milwaukee Brewers (2020-2021)	
Brian Anderson (OF)	August 16, 2005	October 4, 2009	Center fielder	Chicago White Sox (2005-2009), Boston Red Sox (2009)	
Brian Anderson (P)	September 10, 1993	May 8, 2005	Pitcher	California Angels (1993-1995), Cleveland Indians (1996-1997), Arizona Diamondbacks (1998-2002), Cleveland Indians (2003), Kansas City Royals (2003-2005)	
Bryan Anderson	April 15, 2010	October 4, 2015	Catcher	St. Louis Cardinals (2010, 2012), Chicago White Sox (2013), Oakland Athletics (2014-2015)	
Bud Anderson	June 11, 1982	October 2, 1983	Relief pitcher	Cleveland Indians	
Craig Anderson	June 23, 1961	May 31, 1964	Pitcher	St. Louis Cardinals (1961), New York Mets (1962-1964)	
Dave Anderson (IF)	May 8, 1983	October 3, 1992	Infielder	Los Angeles Dodgers (1983-1989), San Francisco Giants (1990-1991), Los Angeles Dodgers (1992)	
Dave Anderson (P)	August 24, 1889	September 29, 1889	Pitcher	Philadelphia Quakers/Phillies (1889-1890), Pittsburgh Alleghenys (1890)	
Drew Anderson	September 11, 2006	October 1, 2006	Outfielder	Milwaukee Brewers	
Dwain Anderson	September 3, 1971	May 28, 1974	Shortstop	Oakland Athletics (1971-1972), St. Louis Cardinals (1972-1973), San Diego Padres (1973), Cleveland Indians (1974)	
Ferrell Anderson	April 16, 1946	September 1, 1953	Catcher	Brooklyn Dodgers (1946), St. Louis Cardinals (1953)	
Fred Anderson	September 25, 1909	July 9, 1918	Pitcher	Boston Red Sox (1909, 1913), Buffalo Buffeds/Blues (1914-1915), New York Giants (1916-1918)	
Garret Anderson	July 27, 1994	August 6, 2010	Left fielder	California/Anaheim Angels/Los Angeles Angels of Anaheim (1994-2008), Atlanta Braves (2009), Los Angeles Dodgers (2010)	
George Anderson	May 26, 1914	September 2, 1918	Outfielder	Brooklyn Tip-Tops (1914-1915), St. Louis Cardinals (1918)	
Goat Anderson	April 11, 1907	October 6, 1907	Rightfielder/Second baseman	Pittsburgh Pirates	
Hal Anderson	April 12, 1932	April 24, 1932	Outfielder	Chicago White Sox	
Harry Anderson	April 18, 1957	May 5, 1961	Left fielder	Philadelphia Phillies (1957-1960), Cincinnati Reds (1960-1961)	
Jason Anderson	March 31, 2003	July 15, 2005	Pitcher	New York Yankees (2003), New York Mets (2003), Cleveland Indians (2004), New York Yankees (2005)	
Jim Anderson	July 2, 1978	September 26, 1984	Shortstop	California Angels (1978-1979), Seattle Mariners (1980-1981), Texas Rangers (1983-1984)	
Jimmy Anderson	July 4, 1999	July 21, 2004	Pitcher	Pittsburgh Pirates (1999-2002), Cincinnati Reds (2003), Chicago Cubs (2004), Boston Red Sox (2004)	
John Anderson (OF)	September 8, 1894	October 2, 1908	Outfielder/First baseman	Brooklyn Grooms/Bridegrooms (1894-1898), Washington Senators (1898), Brooklyn Bridegrooms/Superbas (1898-1899), Milwaukee Brewers (1901-1903), New York Highlanders (1904-1905), Washington Senators (1905-1907), Chicago White Sox (1908)	
John Anderson (P)	August 17, 1958	June 23, 1962	Pitcher	Philadelphia Phillies (1958), Baltimore Orioles (1960), St. Louis Cardinals (1962), Houston Colt .45s (1962)	
Josh Anderson	September 2, 2007	October 2, 2009	Outfielder	Houston Astros (2007), Atlanta Braves (2008), Detroit Tigers (2009), Kansas City Royals (2009)	
Kent Anderson	April 15, 1989	September 6, 1990	Shortstop	California Angels	
Larry Anderson	September 25, 1974	June 26, 1977	Pitcher	Milwaukee Brewers (1974-1975), Chicago White Sox (1977)	
Lars Anderson	September 6, 2010	May 1, 2012	First baseman	Boston Red Sox (2010-2012)	
Marlon Anderson	September 8, 1998	April 10, 2009	Second baseman	Philadelphia Phillies (1998-2002), Tampa Bay Devil Rays (2003), St. Louis Cardinals (2004), New York Mets (2005), Washington Nationals (2006), Los Angeles Dodgers (2006-2007), New York Mets (2007-2009)	
Matt Anderson	June 25, 1998	May 1, 2005	Pitcher	Detroit Tigers (1998-2003), Colorado Rockies (2005)	
Mike Anderson (OF)	September 2, 1971	September 30, 1979	Outfielder	Philadelphia Phillies (1971-1975), St. Louis Cardinals (1976-1977), Baltimore Orioles (1978), Philadelphia Phillies (1979)	
Mike Anderson (P)	September 7, 1993	September 17, 1993	Pitcher	Cincinnati Reds	
Red Anderson	September 19, 1937	September 24, 1971	Pitcher	Washington Senators (1937, 1940-1941)	
Rick Anderson (born 1953)	September 18, 1979	October 5, 1980	Pitcher	New York Yankees (1979), Seattle Mariners (1980)	
Rick Anderson (born 1956)	June 9, 1986	July 28, 1988	Pitcher	New York Mets (1986), Kansas City Royals (1987-1988)	
Scott Anderson	April 8, 1987	August 26, 1995	Pitcher	Texas Rangers (1987), Montreal Expos (1990), Kansas City Royals (1995)	
Sparky Anderson	April 10, 1959	September 27, 1959	Second baseman	Philadelphia Phillies	
Varney Anderson	August 1, 1889	May 6, 1896	Pitcher	Indianapolis Hoosiers (1889), Washington Senators (1894-1896)	
Walter Anderson	May 14, 1917	May 6, 1919	Pitcher	Philadelphia Athletics (1917, 1919)	
Wingo Anderson	April 16, 1910	June 1, 1910	Pitcher	Cincinnati Reds	
Robert Andino	September 4, 2005	September 10, 2016	Infielder	Florida Marlins (2005-2008), Baltimore Orioles (2009-2012), Seattle Mariners (2013), Miami Marlins (2016)	
Steve Andrade	May 1, 2006	May 10, 2006	Relief pitcher	Kansas City Royals	
John André	April 16, 1955	July 16, 1955	Pitcher	Chicago Cubs	
Ernie Andres	April 16, 1946	May 16, 1946	Third baseman	Boston Red Sox	
Kim Andrew	April 16, 1975	April 21, 1975	Second baseman	Boston Red Sox	
Clayton Andrews (baseball, born 1978)	April 16, 2000	June 13, 2000	Pitcher	Toronto Blue Jays	
**Clayton Andrews (baseball, born 1997)**	July 1, 2023		Pitcher	Milwaukee Brewers	
Ed Andrews	May 1, 1884	July 26, 1891	Outfielder	Philadelphia Phillies (1884-1889), Indianapolis Hoosiers (1889), Brooklyn Ward's Wonders (1890), Cincinnati Kelly's Killers (1891)	
Elbert Andrews	May 1, 1925	June 12, 1925	Pitcher	Philadelphia Athletics	
Fred Andrews	September 26, 1976	October 2, 1977	Second baseman	Philadelphia Phillies	
Hub Andrews	April 20, 1947	April 30, 1948	Pitcher	New York Giants	
Ivy Andrews	August 15, 1931	September 28, 1938	Pitcher	New York Yankees (1931-1932), Boston Red Sox (1932-1933), St. Louis Browns (1934-1936), Cleveland Indians (1937), New York Yankees (1937-1938)	
Jim Andrews	April 19, 1890	July 4, 1890	Right fielder	Chicago Cubs	
John Andrews	April 8, 1973	September 19, 1973	Pitcher	St. Louis Cardinals	
Mike Andrews	September 18, 1966	September 29, 1973	Second baseman	Boston Red Sox (1966-1970), Chicago White Sox (1971-1973), Oakland Athletics (1973)	
Nate Andrews	May 1, 1937	June 23, 1946	Pitcher	St. Louis Cardinals (1937, 1939), Cleveland Indians (1940-1941), Boston Braves (1943-1945), Cincinnati Reds (1946), New York Giants (1946)	
Rob Andrews	April 7, 1975	September 26, 1979	Houston Astros (1975-1976), San Francisco Giants (1977-1979)		
Shane Andrews	April 26, 1995	September 29, 2002	Third baseman	Montreal Expos (1995-1999), Chicago Cubs (1999-2000), Boston Red Sox (2002)	
Stan Andrews	June 11, 1939	September 30, 1945	Catcher	Boston Bees (1939-1940), Brooklyn Dodgers (1944-1945), Philadelphia Phillies (1945)	
Wally Andrews	May 22, 1884	August 8, 1888	First baseman	Louisville Eclipse/Colonels (1884, 1888)	
Bill Andrus	September 19, 1931	May 11, 1937	Third baseman	Washington Senators (1931), Philadelphia Phillies (1937)	
**Elvis Andrus**	April 6, 2009		Shortstop	Texas Rangers (2009-2020), Oakland Athletics (2021-2022), Chicago White Sox (2022-2023)	
Fred Andrus	July 25, 1876	July 4, 1884	Outfielder	Chicago White Stockings (1876, 1884)	
Wiman Andrus	September 15, 1885	September 15, 1885	Third baseman	Providence Grays	
Joaquín Andújar	April 8, 1976	September 30, 1988	Pitcher	Houston Astros (1976-1981), St. Louis Cardinals (1981-1985), Oakland Athletics (1986-1987), Houston Astros (1988)	
Luis Andújar	September 8, 1995	June 28, 1998	Pitcher	Chicago White Sox (1995-1996), Toronto Blue Jays (1996-1998)	
Norm Angelini	July 22, 1972	June 19, 1973	Pitcher	Kansas City Royals	
Matt Angle	July 17, 2011	September 28, 2011	Outfielder	Baltimore Orioles	
Tom Angley	April 23, 1929	April 30, 1929	Catcher	Chicago Cubs	
Pat Ankenman	April 16, 1936	June 2, 1944	Second baseman	St. Louis Cardinals (1936), Brooklyn Dodgers (1943-1944)	
Rick Ankiel	August 23, 1999	June 8, 2013	Center fielder/Pitcher	St. Louis Cardinals (1999-2001, 2004, 2007-2009), Kansas City Royals (2010), Atlanta Braves (2010), Washington Nationals (2011-2012), Houston Astros (2013), New York Mets (2013)	
Bill Annis	May 1, 1884	August 8, 1884	Outfielder	Boston Beaneaters	
Cap Anson	May 6, 1871	October 3, 1897	First baseman	Rockford Forest Citys (1871), Philadelphia Athletics (1872-1875), Chicago White Stockings/Colts (1876-1897)	
Eric Anthony	July 28, 1989	September 27, 1997	Outfielder	Houston Astros (1989-1993), Seattle Mariners (1994), Cincinnati Reds (1995-1996), Colorado Rockies (1996), Los Angeles Dodgers (1997)	
Joe Antolick	September 20, 1944	September 25, 1944	Catcher	Philadelphia Phillies	
John Antonelli	September 10, 1944	September 17, 1945	Third/Second baseman	St. Louis Cardinals (1944-1945), Philadelphia Phillies (1945)	
Johnny Antonelli	July 4, 1948	September 4, 1961	Pitcher	Boston/Milwaukee Brewers (1948-1950, 1953), New York/San Francisco Giants (1954-1960), Cleveland Indians (1961), Milwaukee Brewers (1961)	
Matt Antonelli	September 1, 2008	September 28, 2008	Second baseman	San Diego Padres	
Bill Antonello	April 30, 1953	September 27, 1953	Outfielder	Brooklyn Dodgers	
**Norichika Aoki**	April 6, 2012		Outfielder	Milwaukee Brewers (2012-2013), Kansas City Royals (2014), San Francisco Giants (2015), Seattle Mariners (2016), Houston Astros (2017), Toronto Blue Jays (2017), New York Mets (2017)	
Luis Aparicio	April 17, 1956	September 28, 1973	Shortstop	Chicago White Sox (1956-1962), Baltimore Orioles (1963-1967), Chicago White Sox (1968-1970), Boston Red Sox (1971-1973)	
Bob Apodaca	September 18, 1973	September 18, 1977	Pitcher	New York Mets	
Luis Aponte	September 4, 1980	July 6, 1984	Pitcher	Boston Red Sox (1980-1983), Cleveland Indians (1984)	
Kevin Appier	June 4, 1989	April 23, 2004	Pitcher	Kansas City Royals (1989-1999), Oakland Athletics (1999-2000), New York Mets (2001), Anaheim Angels (2002-2003), Kansas City Royals (2003-2004)	
Fred Applegate	September 30, 1904	October 10, 1904	Pitcher	Philadelphia Athletics	
Ed Appleton	April 16, 1915	October 5, 1916	Pitcher	Brooklyn Robins	
Pete Appleton	September 14, 1927	September 20, 1945	Pitcher	Cincinnati Reds (1927-1928), Cleveland Indians (1930-1932), Boston Red Sox (1932), New York Yankees (1933), Washington Senators (1936-1939), Chicago White Sox (1940-1942), St. Louis Browns (1942, 1945), Washington Senators (1945)	
Luke Appling	September 10, 1930	October 1, 1950	Shortstop	Chicago White Sox (1930-1943, 1945-1950)	
Greg Aquino	July 2, 2004	June 17, 2009	Relief pitcher	Arizona Diamondbacks (2004-2006), Milwaukee Brewers (2007), Baltimore Orioles (2008), Cleveland Indians (2009)	
Luis Aquino	August 8, 1986	September 12, 1995	Pitcher	Toronto Blue Jays (1986), Kansas City Royals (1988-1992), Florida Marlins (1993-1994), Montreal Expos (1995), San Francisco Giants (1995)	
Ángel Aragón	August 24, 1914	July 14, 1917	Third baseman	New York Yankees	
Jack Aragón	August 13, 1949	August 13, 1949	Catcher	New York Giants	
Maurice Archdeacon	September 17, 1923	May 29, 1925	Center field	Chicago White Sox	
Fred Archer	September 5, 1936	September 9, 1937	Philadelphia Athletics		
Jim Archer	April 30, 1961	September 19, 1962	Pitcher	Kansas City Athletics	
Jimmy Archer	September 6, 1904	September 2, 1918	Catcher	Pittsburgh Athletics (1904), Detroit Tigers (1907), Chicago Cubs (1909-1917), Brooklyn Robins (1918), Pittsburgh Pirates (1918), Cincinnati Reds (1918)	
George Archie	September 14, 1938	April 21, 1946	Third/Second baseman	Detroit Tigers (1938), Washington Senators (1941), St. Louis Browns (1941, 1946)	
José Arcia	April 10, 1968	September 30, 1970	Infielder	Chicago Cubs (1968), San Diego Padres (1969-1970)	
Dan Ardell	September 14, 1961	September 27, 1961	First baseman	Los Angeles Angels	
Rugger Ardizoia	April 30, 1947	April 30, 1947	Pitcher	New York Yankees	
Joe Ardner	May 1, 1884	August 18, 1890	Second baseman	Cleveland Blues (1884), Cleveland Spiders (1890)	
Danny Ardoin	August 2, 2000	September 26, 2008	Catcher	Minnesota Twins (2000), Texas Rangers (2004), Colorado Rockies (2005-2006), Baltimore Orioles (2006), Los Angeles Dodgers (2008)	
Frank Arellanes	July 17, 1908	August 14, 1910	Pitcher	Boston Red Sox	
J. P. Arencibia	August 7, 2010	October 1, 2015	Catcher	Toronto Blue Jays (2010-2013), Texas Rangers (2014), Tampa Bay Rays (2015)	
Hank Arft	July 27, 1948	May 23, 1952	First baseman	St. Louis Browns	
Alberto Árias	May 1, 2007	August 23, 2009	Pitcher	Colorado Rockies (2007-2008), Houston Astros (2008-2009)	
Alex Arias	May 12, 1992	September 22, 2002	Infielder	Chicago Cubs (1992), Florida Marlins (1993-1997), Philadelphia Phillies (1998-2000), San Diego Padres (2001), New York Yankees (2002)	
George Arias	April 2, 1996	July 28, 1999	Third baseman	California/Anaheim Angels (1996-1997), San Diego Padres (1997-1999)	
Joaquín Árias	September 13, 2006	July 24, 2015	Infielder	Texas Rangers (2006, 2008-2010), New York Mets (2010), San Francisco Giants (2012-2015)	
Rudy Árias	April 10, 1959	August 26, 1959	Pitcher	Chicago White Sox	
Buzz Arlett	April 14, 1931	September 27, 1931	Right fielder	Philadelphia Phillies	
Don Arlich	October 2, 1965	August 4, 1966	Pitcher	Houston Astros	
Steve Arlin	June 17, 1969	September 14, 1974	Pitcher	San Diego Padres (1969-1974), Cleveland Indians (1974)	
Marcos Armas	May 25, 1993	September 23, 1993	First baseman	Oakland Athletics	
Tony Armas	September 6, 1976	October 1, 1989	Outfielder	Pittsburgh Pirates (1976), Oakland Athletics (1977-1982), Boston Red Sox (1983-1986), California Angels (1987-1989)	
Tony Armas Jr.	August 16, 1999	July 7, 2008	Pitcher	Montreal Expos/Washington Nationals (1999-2006), Pittsburgh Pirates (2007), New York Mets (2008)	
Ed Armbrister	August 31, 1973	October 2, 1977	Outfielder	Cincinnati Reds	
Orville Armbrust	September 18, 1934	September 30, 1934	Pitcher	Washington Senators	
Charlie Armbruster	July 17, 1905	September 11, 1907	Catcher	Boston Americans (1905-1907), Chicago White Sox (1907)	
Harry Armbruster	April 30, 1906	October 3, 1906	Outfielder	Philadelphia Athletics	
George Armstrong	April 26, 1946	June 23, 1946	Catcher	Philadelphia Athletics	
Howard Armstrong	September 30, 1911	September 30, 1911	Pitcher	Philadelphia Athletics	
Jack Armstrong	June 21, 1988	April 17, 1994	Pitcher	Cincinnati Reds (1988-1991), Cleveland Indians (1992), Florida Marlins (1993), Texas Rangers (1994)	
Mike Armstrong	August 12, 1980	July 5, 1987	Pitcher	San Diego Padres (1980-1981), Kansas City Royals (1982-1983), New York Yankees (1984-1986), Cleveland Indians (1987)	
Robert Armstrong	June 26, 1871	August 29, 1871	Center fielder	Fort Wayne Kekiongas	
Harry Arndt	July 2, 1902	May 25, 1907	Second baseman/Outfielder	Detroit Tigers (1902), Baltimore Orioles (1902), St. Louis Cardinals (1905-1907)	
Larry Arndt	June 6, 1989	June 7, 1989	First/Second baseman	Oakland Athletics	
Billy Arnold	April 26, 1872	May 2, 1872	Outfielder	Middletown Mansfields	
Chris Arnold	September 7, 1971	October 2, 1976	Infielder	San Francisco Giants (1971-1976)	
Jamie Arnold	April 20, 1999	October 1, 2000	Pitcher	Los Angeles Dodgers (1999-2000), Chicago Cubs (2000)	
Scott Arnold	April 7, 1988	April 23, 1988	Pitcher	St. Louis Cardinals	
Tony Arnold	August 9, 1986	October 3, 1987	Relief pitcher	Baltimore Orioles	
Morrie Arnovich	September 14, 1936	April 21, 1946	Left fielder	Philadelphia Phillies (1936-1940), Cincinnati Reds (1940), New York Giants (1941, 1946)	
Brad Arnsberg	September 6, 1986	April 23, 1992	Pitcher	New York Yankees (1986-1987), Texas Rangers (1989-1991), Cleveland Indians (1992)	
Orie Arntzen	April 20, 1943	September 26, 1943	Pitcher	Philadelphia Athletics	
René Arocha	April 9, 1993	June 6, 1997	Pitcher	St. Louis Cardinals (1993-1996), San Francisco Giants (1997)	
José Arredondo	May 14, 2008	October 3, 2012	Relief pitcher	Los Angeles Angels of Anaheim (2008-2009), Cincinnati Reds (2011-2012)	
Jake Arrieta	June 10, 2010	September 19, 2021	Pitcher	Baltimore Orioles (2010-2013), Chicago Cubs (2013-2017), Philadelphia Phillies (2018-2020), Chicago Cubs (2021), San Diego Padres (2021)	
Gerry Arrigo	June 12, 1961	June 5, 1970	Pitcher	Minnesota Twins (1961-1964), Cincinnati Reds (1965-1966), New York Mets (1966), Cincinnati Reds (1967-1969), Chicago White Sox (1970)	
Rolando Arrojo	April 1, 1998	September 22, 2002	Pitcher	Tampa Bay Devil Rays (1998-1999), Colorado Rockies (2000), Boston Red Sox (2000-2002)	
Bronson Arroyo	June 12, 2000	June 18, 2017	Pitcher	Pittsburgh Pirates (2000-2002), Boston Red Sox (2003-2005), Cincinnati Reds (2006-2013), Arizona Diamondbacks (2014), Cincinnati Reds (2017)	
Fernando Arroyo	June 28, 1975	August 11, 1986	Pitcher	Detroit Tigers (1975, 1977-1979), Minnesota Twins (1980-1982), Oakland Athletics (1982, 1986)	
Luis Arroyo	April 20, 1955	May 28, 1963	Pitcher	St. Louis Cardinals (1955), Pittsburgh Pirates (1956-1957), Cincinnati Reds (1959), New York Yankees (1960-1963)	
Rudy Arroyo	June 1, 1971	June 24, 1971	Pitcher	St. Louis Cardinals	
Harry Arundel	July 19, 1875	October 10, 1884	Pitcher	Brooklyn Atlantics (1875), Pittsburgh Alleghenys (1882), Providence Grays (1884)	
Tug Arundel	May 23, 1882	September 27, 1888	Catcher	Philadelphia Athletics (1882), Toledo Blue Stockings (1884), Indianapolis Hoosiers (1887), Washington Nationals (1888)	
Randy Asadoor	September 14, 1986	October 5, 1986	Third baseman	San Diego Padres	
Jim Asbell	May 8, 1938	October 2, 1938	Outfielder	Chicago Cubs	
Casper Asbjornson	September 17, 1932	August 31, 1932	Catcher	Boston Red Sox (1928-1929), Cincinnati Reds (1931-1932)	
José Ascanio	July 13, 2007	June 5, 2011	Pitcher	Atlanta Braves (2007), Chicago Cubs (2008-2009), Pittsburgh Pirates (2009, 2011)	
**Jairo Asencio**	July 12, 2009		Relief pitcher	Atlanta Braves (2009, 2011), Cleveland Indians (2012), Chicago Cubs (2012), Baltimore Orioles (2013)	
Miguel Asencio	April 6, 2002	April 29, 2006	Pitcher	Kansas City Royals (2002-2003), Colorado Rockies (2006)	
Ken Ash	April 17, 1925	September 26, 1930	Pitcher	Chicago White Sox (1925), Cincinnati Reds (1928-1930)	
Richie Ashburn	April 20, 1948	September 30, 1962	Center fielder	Philadelphia Phillies (1948-1959), Chicago Cubs (1960-1961), New York Mets (1962)	
Alan Ashby	July 3, 1973	May 9, 1989	Catcher	Cleveland Indians (1973-1976), Toronto Blue Jays (1977-1978), Houston Astros (1979-1989)	
Andy Ashby	June 10, 1991	September 14, 2004	Pitcher	Philadelphia Phillies (1991-1992), Colorado Rockies (1993), San Diego Padres (1993-1999), Philadelphia Phillies (2000), Atlanta Braves (2000), Los Angeles Dodgers (2001-2003), San Diego Padres (2004)	
Tucker Ashford	September 21, 1976	May 14, 1984	Third baseman	San Diego Padres (1976-1978), Texas Rangers (1980), New York Yankees (1981), New York Mets (1983), Kansas City Royals (1984)	
Billy Ashley	September 1, 1992	July 30, 1998	Left fielder	Los Angeles Dodgers (1992-1997), Boston Red Sox (1998)	
Tom Asmussen	August 10, 1907	August 19, 1907	Catcher	Boston Doves	
Bob Aspromonte	September 19, 1956	September 28, 1971	Third baseman	Brooklyn/Los Angeles Dodgers (1956, 1960-1961), Houston Colt .45s/Astros (1962-1968), Atlanta Braves (1969-1970), New York Mets (1971)	
Ken Aspromonte	September 2, 1957	June 21, 1963	Second baseman	Boston Red Sox (1957-1958), Washington Senators (1958-1960), Cleveland Indians (1960, 1961-1962), Los Angeles Angels (1961), Milwaukee Braves (1962), Chicago Cubs (1963)	
Brian Asselstine	September 14, 1976	October 3, 1981	Outfielder	Atlanta Braves	
Paul Assenmacher	April 12, 1986	October 3, 1999	Pitcher	Atlanta Braves (1986-1989), Chicago Cubs (1989-1993), New York Yankees (1993), Chicago White Sox (1994), Cleveland Indians (1995-1999)	
Ezequiel Astacio	May 3, 2005	May 10, 2006	Pitcher	Houston Astros (2005-2006)	
Pedro Astacio	July 3, 1992	September 27, 2006	Pitcher	Los Angeles Dodgers (1992-1997), Colorado Rockies (1997-2001), Houston Astros (2001), New York Mets (2002-2003), Boston Red Sox (2004), Texas Rangers (2005), San Diego Padres (2005), Washington Nationals (2006)	
Joe Astroth	August 13, 1945	May 13, 1956	Catcher	Philadelphia/Kansas City Athletics (1945-1946; 1949-1956)	
Scott Atchison	July 31, 2004	June 22, 2015	Pitcher	Seattle Mariners (2004-2005), San Francisco Giants (2007), Boston Red Sox (2010-2012), New York Mets (2013), Cleveland Indians (2014-2015)	
Justin Atchley	April 7, 2001	July 12, 2001	Pitcher	Cincinnati Reds	
Charlie Atherton	May 30, 1899	August 22, 1899	Third baseman	Washington Senators	
Keith Atherton	July 14, 1983	August 5, 1989	Pitcher	Oakland Athletics (1983-1986), Minnesota Twins (1986-1988), Cleveland Indians (1989)	
Luis Atilano	April 23, 2010	July 20, 2010	Pitcher	Washington Nationals	
Garrett Atkins	August 3, 2003	June 25, 2010	Second baseman	Colorado Rockies (2003-2009), Baltimore Orioles (2010)	
James Atkins	September 29, 1950	May 10, 1952	Pitcher	Boston Red Sox (1950, 1952)	
**Mitch Atkins**	July 29, 2009		Pitcher	Chicago Cubs (2009-2010), Baltimore Orioles (2011)	
Tommy Atkins	October 2, 1909	September 28, 1910	Pitcher	Philadelphia Athletics	
Al Atkinson	May 1, 1884	August 13, 1887	Pitcher	Philadelphia Athletics (1884), Chicago Browns (1884), Baltimore Monumentals (1884), Philadelphia Athletics (1886-1887)	
Bill Atkinson	September 18, 1976	September 26, 1979	Pitcher	Montreal Expos	
Ed Atkinson	October 22, 1873	October 23, 1873	Right fielder	Washington Blue Legs	
Harry Atkinson	September 25, 1895	September 25, 1895	Left fielder	St. Louis Browns (1895)	
Lefty Atkinson	August 5, 1927	August 5, 1927	Pinch runner	Washington Senators	
Dick Attreau	September 14, 1926	September 28, 1927	First baseman	Philadelphia Phillies	
Toby Atwell	April 15, 1952	September 28, 1956	Catcher	Chicago Cubs (1952-1953), Pittsburgh Pirates (1953-1956), Milwaukee Braves (1956)	
Bill Atwood	April 15, 1936	September 29, 1940	Catcher	Philadelphia Phillies	
Jake Atz	September 24, 1902	September 30, 1909	Second baseman/Shortstop	Washington Senators (1902), Chicago White Sox (1907-1909)	
Chub Aubrey	April 22, 1903	September 27, 1903	Shortstop	Boston Beaneaters	
Michael Aubrey	May 17, 2008	October 4, 2009	First baseman	Cleveland Indians (2008), Baltimore Orioles (2009)	
Derek Aucoin	May 21, 1996	May 25, 1996	Pitcher	Montreal Expos	
Rich Aude	September 9, 1993	May 15, 1996	First baseman	Pittsburgh Pirates (1993, 1995-1996)	
Rick Auerbach	April 13, 1971	August 12, 1981	Shortstop	Milwaukee Brewers (1971-1973), Los Angeles Dodgers (1974-1976), Cincinnati Reds (1977-1980), Seattle Mariners (1981)	
Bryan Augenstein	May 13, 2009	April 12, 2011	Pitcher	Arizona Diamondbacks (2009), St. Louis Cardinals (2011)	
Don August	June 2, 1988	October 1, 1991	Pitcher	Milwaukee Brewers	
Dave Augustine	September 3, 1973	October 2, 1974	Outfielder	Pittsburgh Pirates	
Jerry Augustine	September 9, 1975	April 11, 1984	Pitcher	Milwaukee Brewers	
Elden Auker	August 10, 1933	September 20, 1942	Pitcher	Detroit Tigers (1933-1938), Boston Red Sox (1939), St. Louis Browns (1940-1942)	
Leslie Aulds	May 25, 1947	June 22, 1947	Catcher	Boston Red Sox	
Doug Ault	September 9, 1976	October 5, 1980	First baseman	Texas Rangers (1976), Toronto Blue Jays (1977-1978, 1980)	
Rich Aurilia	September 6, 1995	October 4, 2009	Shortstop	San Francisco Giants (1995-2003), Seattle Mariners (2004), San Diego Padres (2004), Cincinnati Reds (2005-2006), San Francisco Giants (2007-2009)	
Joe Ausanio	July 14, 1994	September 15, 1995	Relief pitcher	New York Yankees (1994-1995)	
Brad Ausmus	July 28, 1993	October 3, 2010	Catcher	San Diego Padres (1993-1996), Detroit Tigers (1996), Houston Astros (1997-1998), Detroit Tigers (1999-2000), Houston Astros (2001-2008), Los Angeles Dodgers (2009-2010)	
Dennis Aust	September 6, 1965	May 7, 1966	Pitcher	St. Louis Cardinals	
Henry Austin	April 28, 1873	August 7, 1873	Outfielder	Elizabeth Resolutes	
Jeff Austin	June 26, 2001	May 28, 2003	Pitcher	Kansas City Royals (2001-2002), Cincinnati Reds (2003)	
Jim Austin	July 4, 1991	July 21, 1993	Pitcher	Milwaukee Brewers	
Jimmy Austin	April 19, 1909	October 6, 1929	Third baseman	New York Highlanders (1909-1910), St. Louis Browns (1925-1926, 1929)	
Rick Austin	June 21, 1970	June 27, 1976	Pitcher	Cleveland Indians (1970-1971), Milwaukee Brewers (1975-1976)	
Al Autry	September 14, 1976	September 14, 1976	Pitcher	Atlanta Braves	
Chick Autry (C)	April 20, 1924	September 18, 1930	Catcher	New York Yankees (1924), Cleveland Indians (1926-1928), Chicago White Sox (1929-1930)	
Chick Autry (1B)	September 18, 1907	October 7, 1909	First baseman	Cincinnati Reds (1907, 1909), Boston Doves (1909)	
Bruce Aven	August 27, 1997	May 27, 2002	Outfielder	Cleveland Indians (1997), Florida Marlins (1999), Pittsburgh Pirates (2000), Los Angeles Dodgers (2000-2001), Cleveland Indians (2002)	
Earl Averill	April 16, 1929	April 25, 1941	Center fielder	Cleveland Indians (1929-1939), Detroit Tigers (1939-1940), Boston Braves (1941)	
Earl Averill Jr.	April 19, 1956	September 26, 1963	Catcher	Cleveland Indians (1956, 1958), Chicago Cubs (1959-1960), Chicago White Sox (1960), Los Angeles Angels (1961-1962), Philadelphia Phillies (1963)	
Steve Avery	June 13, 1990	July 20, 2003	Pitcher	Atlanta Braves (1990-1996), Boston Red Sox (1997-1998), Cincinnati Reds (1999), Detroit Tigers (2003)	
Alex Avila	August 6, 2009	October 3, 2021	Catcher	Detroit Tigers (2009-2015), Chicago White Sox (2016), Detroit Tigers (2017), Chicago Cubs (2017), Arizona Diamondbacks (2018-2019), Minnesota Twins (2020), Washington Nationals (2021)	
Bobby Ávila	April 30, 1949	September 29, 1959	Second baseman	Cleveland Indians (1949-1958), Baltimore Orioles (1959), Boston Red Sox (1959), Milwaukee Braves (1959)	
Mike Avilés	May 29, 2008	October 1, 2017	Infielder	Kansas City Royals (2008-2011), Boston Red Sox (2011-2012), Cleveland Indians (2013-2015), Detroit Tigers (2016), Miami Marlins (2017)	
Ramón Avilés	July 10, 1977	October 4, 1981	Second baseman	Boston Red Sox (1977), Philadelphia Phillies (1979-1981)	
Jay Avrea	April 22, 1950	May 6, 1950	Pitcher	Cincinnati Reds (1950)	
Dylan Axelrod	September 7, 2011	August 18, 2015	Pitcher	Chicago White Sox (2011-2013), Cincinnati Reds (2014-2015)	
John Axford	September 15, 2009	August 2, 2021	Pitcher	Milwaukee Brewers (2009-2013), St. Louis Cardinals (2013), Cleveland Indians (2014), Pittsburgh Pirates (2014), Colorado Rockies (2015), Oakland Athletics (2016-2017), Toronto Blue Jays (2018), Los Angeles Dodgers (2018), Milwaukee Brewers (2021)	
Benny Ayala	August 27, 1974	October 2, 1985	Designated hitter/Left fielder	New York Mets (1974, 1976), St. Louis Cardinals (1977), Baltimore Orioles (1979-1984), Cleveland Indians (1985)	
Bobby Ayala	September 5, 1992	October 2, 1999	Pitcher	Cincinnati Reds (1992-1993), Seattle Mariners (1994-1998), Montreal Expos (1999), Chicago Cubs (1999)	
Luis Ayala	March 31, 2003	September 29, 2013	Pitcher	Montreal Expos/Washington Nationals (2003-2005, 2007-2008)	
Erick Aybar	May 16, 2006	October 1, 2017	Shortstop	Los Angeles Angels of Anaheim (2006-2015), Atlanta Braves (2016), Detroit Tigers (2016), San Diego Padres (2017)	
Manny Aybar	August 4, 1997	June 10, 2005	Pitcher	St. Louis Cardinals (1997-1999), Colorado Rockies (2000), Cincinnati Reds (2000), Florida Marlins (2000), Chicago Cubs (2001), San Francisco Giants (2002-2003), New York Mets (2005)	
Willy Aybar	August 31, 2005	October 3, 2010	Infielder	Los Angeles Dodgers (2005-2006), Atlanta Braves (2006), Tampa Bay Rays (2008-2010)	
Jake Aydelott	May 15, 1884	July 12, 1886	Pitcher	Indianapolis Hoosiers (1884), Philadelphia Athletics (1886)	
Bill Ayers	April 17, 1947	July 13, 1947	Pitcher	New York Giants	
Doc Ayers	September 9, 1913	May 21, 1921	Pitcher	Washington Senators (1913-1919), Detroit Tigers (1919-1921)	
Dick Aylward	May 1, 1953	May 20, 1953	Catcher	Cleveland Indians	
Bob Ayrault	June 7, 1992	July 25, 1993	Relief pitcher	Philadelphia Phillies (1992-1993), Seattle Mariners (1993)	
Joe Ayrault	September 1, 1996	September 29, 1996	Catcher	Atlanta Braves	
Joe Azcue	August 3, 1960	September 29, 1972	Catcher	Cincinnati Reds (1960), Kansas City Athletics (1962-1963), Cleveland Indians (1963-1969), Boston Red Sox (1969), California Angels (1969-1970, 1972), Milwaukee Brewers (1972)	
Oscar Azócar	July 17, 1990	October 4, 1992	Left fielder	New York Yankees (1990), San Diego Padres (1991-1992)	
