= Senator Allison (disambiguation) =

William B. Allison (1829–1908) was a U.S. Senator from Iowa from 1897 to 1908. Senator Allison may also refer to:

- Abraham K. Allison (1810–1893), Confederate Florida State Senate
- Emery Allison (1894–1977), Missouri State Senate
- Lyn Allison (born 1946), Australian Senate
