= Henry Allison =

Henry Allison may refer to:

- Henry Allison (cricketer) (1828–1881), Australian cricketer
- Henry E. Allison (1937–2023), professor of philosophy
- Hank Allison (Henry Henderson Allison, born 1947), former American football offensive tackle
- Cliff Allison (Henry Clifford Allison, 1932–2005), racing driver

== See also ==
- William Henry Allison (1838–1934), Canadian politician and school lands commissioner
