= Lelah Allison =

American college professor (1893–1956)

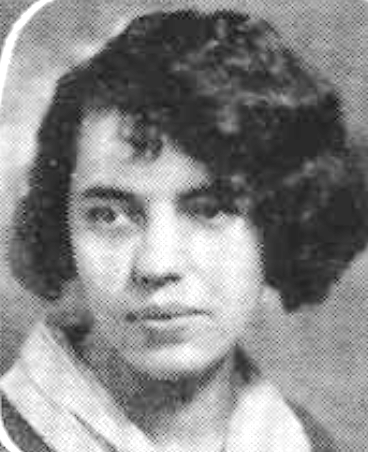
- Lelah Allison, from the 1928 yearbook of Illinois State Normal School
- Born: September 16, 1893; Ellery, Illinois, U.S.
- Died: January 7, 1956 (age 62); Ellery, Illinois, U.S.
- Occupations: College professor, folklorist

Lelah Susan Allison (September 16, 1893 – January 7, 1956) was an American folklorist and educator, based in Illinois.

== Early life and education ==
Allison was born in Ellery, Illinois, the daughter of James McCoin Allison and Margaret Isabelle Lines Allison. She graduated from Illinois State Normal School in 1928, and earned a master's degree from the University of Missouri in 1940.

== Career ==
Allison taught at schools in Allendale and Keensburg. In summer 1946, she taught at Southern Illinois Normal University. She became a member of the English faculty at McKendree College in Lebanon, Illinois from 1947. She explained of her folklore work that "at least some of our folklore is not behind us, but is growing up around us."

== Publications ==
Allison wrote a local history, The History of Leech Township (1954), and was a published poet. Her studies of folklore were published in academic journals including Journal of American Folklore, Hoosier Folklore, and American Speech.

- "MU Colloquialisms" (1941)
- "Water Witching" (1947)
- "Children's Games" (1948)
- "Folk Beliefs Regarding Weather in Southeastern Illinois" (1948)
- "Traditional Verse from Autograph Books" (1949)
- "Folk Beliefs Collected in Southeastern Illinois" (1950)
- "Southeastern Illinois Tales and Beliefs" (1950)
- The History of Leech Township (1954)

== Personal life ==
Allison died when a freight train crashed into her car in Ellery in 1956; she was 62 years old.
