= John Allison =

John Allison may refer to:

- John Allison (Canadian politician) (1753–1821), Irish-born farmer, merchant and politician in Nova Scotia
- John Allison (Representative) (1812–1878), U.S. Representative for Pennsylvania's 20th and 23rd Districts
- John Fall Allison (1825–1897), pioneer settler, justice of the peace and Gold Commissioner in the Similkameen Country of the Southern Interior of British Columbia, Canada
- John W. Allison (1893–1981), artist, collector and singer of folk songs
- John Moore Allison (1905–1978), U.S. ambassador to Japan, Indonesia, and Czechoslovakia
- Sir John Allison (RAF officer) (born 1943), Air Chief Marshal, RAF
- John A. Allison IV (born 1948), chairman and former CEO of BB&T
- John Allison (anthroposophist) (born 1950), New Zealand/Australian poet, musician, and anthroposophist
- John Allison (special effects designer), American special effects designer
- John Allison (comics) (born 1976), author of the webcomics Scary Go Round and Giant Days
- John-Allison Weiss (born 1987), American singer/songwriter

== See also ==
- John R. Alison (1912–2011), World War II ace
