= Allison Williams (disambiguation) =

Allison Williams (born 1988) is an American actress.

Allison Williams may also refer to:

- Allison Williams (Miss West Virginia) (born c. 1981), 2003 pageant titleholder
- Allison Williams (reporter) (born 1984), Fox Sports reporter
- Allison Williams (footballer) (born 1998), Saint Kitts and Nevis footballer

== See also ==
- Allyson Williams (born 1947), Trinidadian-born British midwife and carnival organiser
- Alyson Williams (born 1962), American R&B singer
- William Allison (disambiguation)
