= David Allison =

David Allison may refer to:

- David Allison, Physicist, founder of Signetics
- David B. Allison (born 1963), Professor, Obesity researcher, Indiana University
- Davey Allison (1961–1993), NASCAR race car driver
- David Allison, 2000 Canadian federal election Communist Party candidate
- David Allison (Australian politician) (1865–1928), member of the Parliament of Victoria
- David Allison (referee) (born 1948), English Premier League soccer official
- Dave Allison (born 1959), former ice hockey player and current head coach
- David Wright Allison (1826–1906), Canadian politician, farmer, manufacturer and speculator
- David Allison (cricketer) (born 1948), English cricketer
- David Allison (college president) (1836–1924), Canadian academic
- David Allison (footballer) (1873–?), English footballer
- David Clark Allison (1881–1962), American architect with Allison & Allison
- David Blair Allison (1944–2016), Professor of Philosophy, Stony Brook University
