= Robert Allison =

Robert Allison may refer to:

- Robert Allison (pirate) (fl. 1679–1699), buccaneer and privateer
- Bob Allison (1934–1995), professional baseball player
- Bobby Allison (1937–2024), American NASCAR driver
- Bobby Allison (footballer) (1895–1948), Australian rules footballer for South Melbourne
- Robert Allison (Pennsylvania politician) (1777–1840), United States Representative from Pennsylvania
- Robert Allison (South Dakota politician) (1846–1924), South Dakota State Representative
- Robert Clay Allison (1841–1887), gunfighter and figure of the American Old West
- Robert Allison (geographer) (born 1961), British academic and vice-chancellor and president of Loughborough University
- Robert Andrew Allison (1838–1926), English Liberal politician
- Robert H. Allison (1893–1959), American politician and lawyer
- Bob Allison (rugby league), Australian rugby league player
