= Joseph Allison =

Joseph Allison may refer to:

- Joseph Allison (South African politician) (1817–1869), South African politician
- Joseph Allison (Canadian politician) (c. 1755–1806), farmer and politician in Nova Scotia
- Joe Allison (1924–2002), songwriter
- Joe Allison (American football) (born 1970), former American football placekicker
