= Ellery, Illinois =

- Unincorporated community
- Location within Illinois Location within the United States
- Coordinates: 38°21′17″N 88°08′55″W
- Country: United States
- State: Illinois
- County: Edwards, Wayne
- Elevation: 430 ft (130 m)
- Time zone: UTC-6 (Central (CST))
  - Summer (DST): UTC-5 (CDT)
- ZIP code: 62833
- Area code: 618
- GNIS feature ID: 407887

Ellery is an unincorporated community on the border of Edwards and Wayne counties in the U.S. state of Illinois. The eastern side lies in Edwards and the west side in Wayne; the county line runs down the main street.

== History ==
Ellery was created in 1880 and was named for the man who surveyed the railroad right of way and the town blocks.

William Lines had donated many lots for the settlement and had been instrumental in securing the stock pens built there on the railroad. Therefore, it was suggested that the town should be called Linesville. However, when that name was submitted for the name of the post office, it was rejected as there was already a Linsville in the state.

The post office has always been on the east side of the street in Edwards County, so the town is listed in Edwards County, Illinois. The business section of town was always in Wayne County.

Although Ellery never had a school within its limits, it early built a church, the Ellery Christian Church, which still functions. At one time there was a woolen Mill which stood at the north end of Ellery. For several years a creamery operated at the south end.

Although small, Ellery is compact and neat. It is composed of forty-five lots, each 66x 132 feet in size. The streets were of the same width and named Main, Edwards and Wayne. The alleys were 12 feet wide. In all, the town covers a square with sides only one-eight of a mile long.

For a considerable time, Ellery was quite a busy place. At one time it had five stores kept by Mr. Lance and son, Albert Kimbrell, Morris Mckibben and George Knodell. They also had two barber shops kept by Thomas meadows and Frank Clutter. Ezra Michels built the first house in Ellery. The first store was built in 1882, north of the railroad and operated by Bob Ramsey and Ted Woods.

George Pettigrew had one of the first stores in Ellery. It was in Wayne County. Others, including Morrie McKibben, later had a store in that same building. Al Kimbrell had a store near the same spot for several year: he was also postmaster during the first decade of the 19th Century. a Mr. Land then kept store in the same building. Later Nell Rook Murphy (the postmistress) and May Inskeep Woods operated a store there.

Lafayette lines built a frame store, south of the railroad tracks, which Mr. Lance bought and moved across the street and farther south where it was used as a blacksmith shop by Wright Willis. At one time George Stroup had a large sawmill and grist mill, about 40 x 50 feet in size and three stories high. In July 1915 a grain elevator was constructed.
