= Richard Allison =

Richard Allison may refer to:

- Richard Allison (composer) (c. 1560/70–before 1610), English composer
- Richard Allison (military physician) (1757–1816), Physician General of the U.S. Army
- Richard Allison (architect) (1869–1958), Scottish architect
- Rick Allison (born 1964), Belgian musician
