= David Allison (cricketer) =

English cricketer (born 1948)

Personal information
- Full name: David Farquhar Allison
- Born: 26 June 1948 (age 78); Marylebone, London
- Batting: Right-handed

Domestic team information
- Years: Team
- 1970: Oxford University Cricket Club
- FC debut: 29 April 1970 Oxford University v Hampshire
- Last FC: 11 July 1970 Oxford University v Cambridge University

Career statistics
Competition	First-class
Matches	6
Runs scored	48
Batting average	6.85
100s/50s	0/0
Top score	21
Catches/stumpings	4/–
- Source: CricInfo, 6 August 2008

David Farquhar Allison (born 26 June 1948) is an English former first-class cricketer. He was a right-handed batsman and wicket-keeper who played first-class cricket in 1970 for Oxford University Cricket Club. He was born at Marylebone in London and educated at Greenmore College in Birmingham and Brasenose College, Oxford.

Allison played two games for Warwickshire Second XI in 1968. He made his first-class debut for Oxford University against Hampshire County Cricket Club in April 1970. He went on to play six first-class and three other matches for the university side during 1970, including playing in the 1970 University Match.
