= Bill Allison (footballer) =

English footballer

Personal information
- Full name: William Martin Laws Allison
- Date of birth: 13 January 1908
- Place of birth: Shildon, England
- Date of death: 1981 (aged 73) (Note: Allison's death at the age of 73 was registered in the fourth quarter of 1981 in the Durham Western registration district.)
- Place of death: County Durham, England
- Height: 5 ft 8 1/2 in (1.74 m)
- Position: Left back

Senior career*
Years	Team	Apps	(Gls)
–	Shildon		
1929–1931	Arsenal	0	(0)
1931–1932	Clapton Orient	14	(0)
1932–1934	Darlington	52	(0)
–	Eden Colliery Welfare		
1935–1938	Hartlepools United	107	(0)
–	Walker Celtic		
–	Spennymoor United		
- * Club domestic league appearances and goals

William Martin Laws Allison (13 January 1908 – 1981) was an English footballer who made 173 appearances in the Football League playing as a left back for Clapton Orient, Darlington and Hartlepools United in the 1930s.

== Biography ==
Bill Allison was born in Shildon, County Durham, on 13 January 1908. He played for Shildon before joining Arsenal for £50 in 1929 where he was on the books for two seasons, playing reserve football without breaking into the first team. He transferred to Clapton Orient in May 1931, making his League debut against Crystal Palace in August 1931 and a total of 14 league appearances before leaving for Darlington in 1932 for whom he played 52 senior games. After a brief spell at Eden Colliery, he joined Hartlepools United in May 1935 where he made 119 senior appearances. He finished his career at Spennymoor United. Allison died in 1981 at Shildon.
