= Wade Allison =

British physicist (born 1941)

- Born: 1941 (age 84–85); Britain
- Education: Universities of Cambridge and Oxford
- Title: Emeritus Professor

Wade Allison (born 1941) is a British physicist who is Emeritus professor of Physics and Fellow of Keble College at Oxford University. Author of Nuclear is for Life: A Cultural Revolution, Radiation and Reason: The Impact of Science on a Culture of Fear , Fundamental Physics for Probing and Imaging

== Early life ==
Wade Allison was educated at Rugby School and then at Trinity College, Cambridge as an Open Exhibitioner in Natural Science. He gained a First Class in Part I of the Tripos, before taking Part II in Physics and Part III in Mathematics in 1963. At Oxford he studied for a DPhil in Particle Physics, on the way becoming the last student permitted to operate Oxford University's thermionic valve Ferranti Mercury computer. He was elected to a Research Lecturership (JRF) at Christ Church, Oxford in 1967 and a Fellow of the Royal Commission for the Exhibition of 1851. He spent two years at the Argonne National Laboratory before returning to Oxford in 1970.

In 1976 he was appointed a university lecturer in the Physics Department at Oxford, later with the title of professor. At the same time he was elected to a tutorial fellowship at Keble College. He was a visiting professor at the University of Minnesota in 1995. During his career he served periods as associate chairman of the Oxford Physics Department, senior tutor and sub-warden of Keble College. He retired officially in 2008, since when he has continued to teach, lecture and study. He was elected to an emeritus fellowship at Keble College in 2010.

== Research interests ==
His background is in experimental Particle Physics. In earlier years he developed new experimental methods with their theory, and applied these in experiments on quarks at CERN and on neutrinos in the USA. He made special studies on the fields of relativistic charged particles in matter including Cherenkov Radiation, Transition radiation and other mechanisms of energy loss, dEdx. As a result of initiating some years ago an optional student course on applications of nuclear physics, his interest became increasingly engaged with medical physics, in particular safety, therapy and imaging across the full spectrum: ionizing radiation, ultrasound and magnetic resonance. In 2006 he published an advanced student text book Fundamental Physics for Probing and Imaging. In his second book Radiation and Reason he brought the scientific evidence of the effect of radiation to a wider audience. After the Fukushima accident this was translated into Japanese and Chinese. His third book Nuclear is for Life is a broad study that contrasts the cultural rejection of nuclear energy with the evidence, at all but the highest levels, for the harmless, and even beneficial, interaction of radiation with life.

== Academic biography ==
- Emeritus Fellow, Keble College, Oxford (2010)
- Fellow by Special Election and Senior College Lecturer, Keble College, Oxford (2008)
- Visiting Professor, Dept of Physics & Astronomy, University of Minnesota (1995)
- Tutorial Fellow of Keble College, Oxford (1976–2008)
- University Lecturer in Physics, Oxford (1976–2008)
- Research Officer, Nuclear Physics Lab., Oxford (1970–1975)
- Post-doctoral appointment, Argonne National Laboratory, Illinois, USA (1968–1970)
- Research Lecturer, Christchurch, Oxford (1966–1971)
- Christchurch, Oxford, D Phil (1963–1968)
- Trinity College, Cambridge, Open Exhibitioner, Nat. Sci. Pt I (First), Physics Pt II (Second) Maths Pt III (1959–1963)

== Bibliography ==
Books

- Nuclear is for Life: A Cultural Revolution. (ISBN 978-0-9562756-4-6, December 2015) Website: http://www.nuclear4life.com
- Radiation and Reason: The Impact of Science on a Culture of Fear. (ISBN 978-0-9562756-1-5, October 2009) Website: https://www.radiationandreason.com
- Fundamental Physics for Probing and Imaging. (ISBN 978-0-19-920389-5, Oxford University Press, October 2006)

Selected articles

- Wade Allison, Life and Nuclear Radiation: Chernobyl and Fukushima in Perspective, European Journal of Risk Regulation (Lexxion, Berlin) 2(2011)373
- Wade Allison, We Should Stop Running Away from Radiation, Philosophy and Technology (Springer) 24(2011)193
- WWM Allison et al., Ab initio liquid hydrogen muon cooling simulations with ELMS, J Phys G Nucl. Part. Phys. 34(2007)679–685
- G Alner, D Ayres, G Barr et al., Neutrino Oscillation Effects in Soudan-2 Physical Review D, 72 (2005), 052005 23pp
- WWM Allison Calculations of energy loss and multiple scattering (ELMS) in Molecular Hydrogen J Phys G, 29 (2003), 1701–1703
- WWM Allison et al., The atmospheric neutrino flavor ratio from a 3.9 fiducial kiloton year exposure of Soudan2 Physics Letters, B 449 137 (1999)
- WWM Allison An article in Experimental Techniques in High Energy Physics, ed. Ferbel, World Scientific (1991)
- WWM Allison and JH Cobb, Relativistic Charged Particle Identification by Energy Loss Annual Reviews in Nuclear & Particle Science, 30 (1980), 253
