= Mary Bruins Allison =

American physician

- Born: Mary Bruins; March 19, 1903; Holland, Michigan
- Died: September 15, 1994 (aged 91)
- Education: Woman's Medical College of Pennsylvania, Philadelphia, PA
- Occupation: Missionary Physician
- Known for: Missionary Physician work in the Middle East, including Kuwait, India, Qatar, Bahrain, and Oman
- Spouse: Norman Allison (m. June 14, 1937, div. 1943)

Mary Bruins Allison (March 19, 1903 – September 15, 1994) was one of the first American women to be trained in medicine in the United States to work as a missionary physician in Arabia. While attending medical college in Philadelphia, she learned Arabic. In 1934, she went to the Middle East to work as a missionary physician. In her forty-year long career, she worked primarily in Kuwait, as well as India, Qatar, Bahrain and Oman. In her capacity in Kuwait, she treated rich and poor women.

To be successful, she had to overcome a number of obstacles, including limited trained medical staff, insufficient medical resources, as well as barriers due to cultural, lingual and religious differences. She made significant contributions in establishing modern medical care in the countries where she worked; Allison was asked by the rulers of Bahrain and Oman to help establish hospitals in their countries. She returned to the United States in 1975.

== Early life and education ==
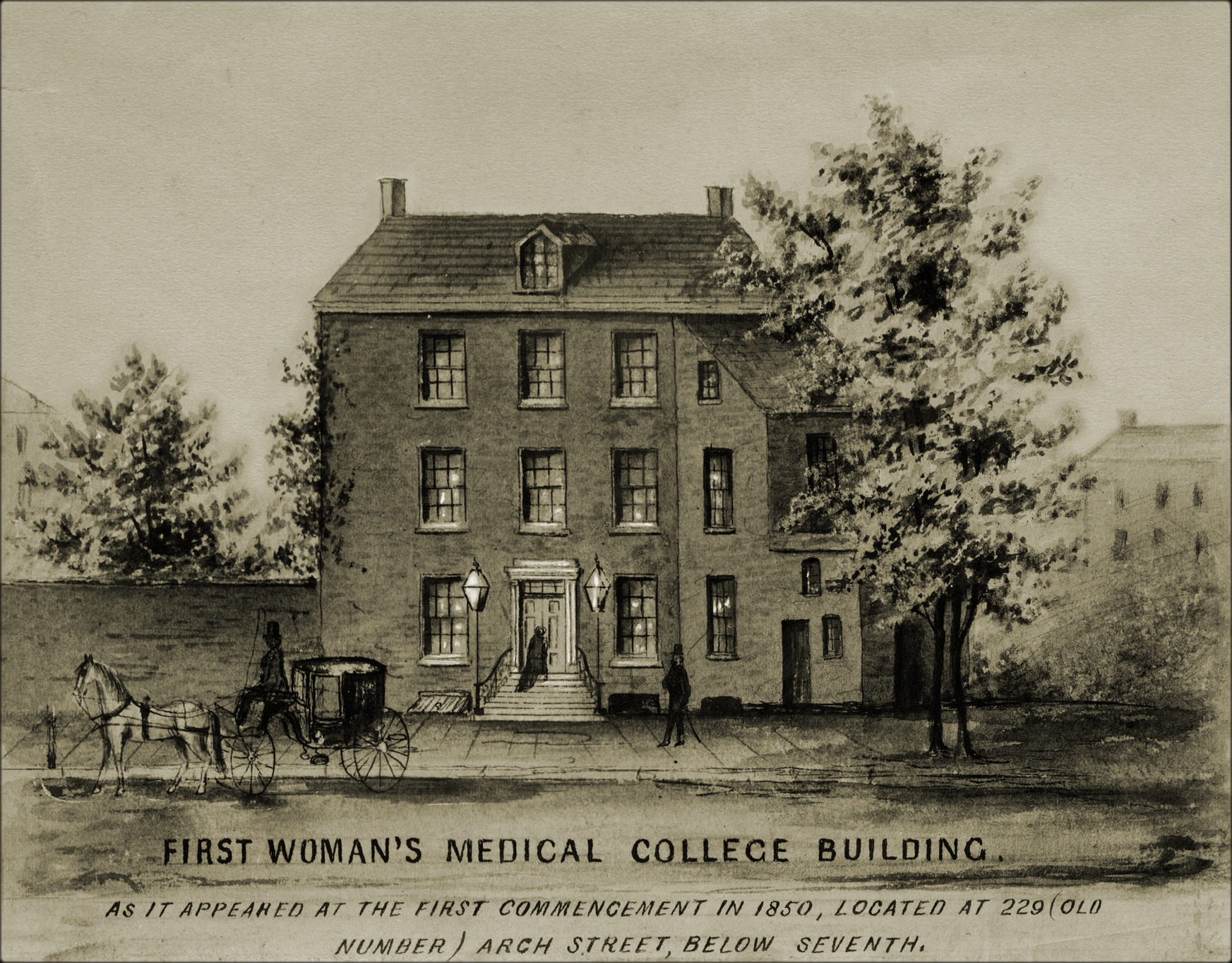
The first building to house the Woman's Medical College of Pennsylvania. In the late 1920s money was raised to build a campus.

On March 19, 1903, Mary Bruins was born in Holland, Michigan to Henry Bruins and Mary Huizinga. In 1907, her father accepted a position as minister at the First Reformed Church in Milwaukee, Wisconsin. The Bruins family moved in 1917 to Pella, Iowa and she attended Pella High School.

In the fall of 1922, she began her studies at Central College in Pella. She joined the Woman's Medical College of Pennsylvania in Philadelphia in the fall of 1928. In 1932, she interned at Wisconsin General Hospital in Madison, Wisconsin. She studied Arabic from 1933 to 1934 at Hartford Theological School. In 1934, she did her second internship at the University of Illinois at Chicago in obstetrics.

== Career ==
=== Kuwait ===
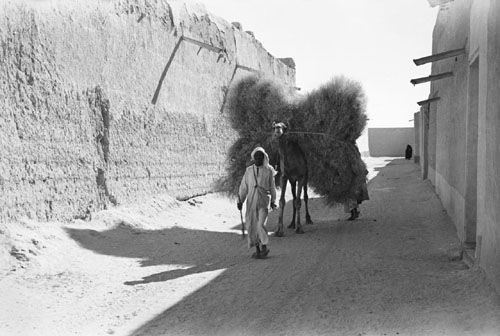
Camel in Kuwait carrying fuel for cooking, 1938. Allison "described Kuwait homes as box-like buildings, whose outer enclosures formed a windowless high wall. Narrow passages between the row of houses provided space for pedestrians and donkeys".

Allison arrived in Kuwait City, Kuwait in 1934. In the beginning, she studied Arabic in the mornings and then worked at the mission. The hospital was built land by the Kuwait Bay that was provided by Shaikh Mubarak, who had invited the Arabian Mission to run a hospital in the city. (Note: At this time in Kuwait, the oil concession was granted to a joint American and British enterprise, forming the Kuwait Oil Company Ltd. The British were the formal protectors of Kuwait since 1899. As a result, there was a political agent in Kuwait City who handled Kuwait's foreign concerns.)

Due to cultural constraints, Allison generally treated women. Her patients were of all social classes, from the richest woman who was her first patient, to the poorest women originally from Iran. Allison was required to first attend to the VIP, or aristocratic women, who she charged an extra fee for the convenience.

It was a cultural norm for women to have their babies at their home or their mother's home, and professional medical attention was not sought unless there was a problem. This meant that when Allison handled deliveries, they were more likely to be due to prenatal complications. To treat these cases, Dr. Allison often needed to leave the hospital to make house calls. Some women died due to complications in their homes. Over time, more pregnant women went to the hospital for prenatal care and delivery.

=== Several places ===
In 1940, Allison followed her husband to India, where she worked for two years. She then returned to the United States and worked at a medical practice in New Jersey. In 1943, she rejoined her husband in India, and despite their decision to divorce, she stayed and worked at Dahanu Mission Hospital till 1945. She decided to return to Kuwait because she preferred it there. In 1948, a request to establish a hospital in Doha was made by the sheikh of Qatar, where Allison worked for four months. In 1964, a medical malpractice complaint was filed against Allison; this subsequently led to the end of her career in Kuwait. She was transferred to Bahrain in 1964.

Around 1967, the Church began to question why it conducted missions in areas where people were not converting to Christianity. Some board members of the Reformed Church Board further wondered why the church provided medical care to an oil rich country. In March 1967, the medical mission was closed.

=== Bahrain and Oman ===
By 1970, Allison had worked in Bahrain for five years and was over sixty-five years old, the retirement age for a missionary. Reluctantly, she retired from Bahrain and returned to the U.S. In 1971, however, she received a call that said that the mission board requested that she work at the Mutrah Hospital in Oman. The Sultan wanted to run free hospitals but did not have sufficient medical staff. She treated many diseases, including malaria, leprosy and the cholera epidemic of 1974. She retired for the last time in 1974 and moved in 1975 to Redlands, California.

== Personal life ==
She met her British husband Norman Allison in 1937. The two got married on June 14, 1937 and later divorced in 1943.

== Death ==
Allison died on September 15, 1994.

== Sources ==
- Allison, D. M. (1994). Sandra J. Shaw (ed.). Doctor Mary in Arabia (First ed.). Austin, Texas: University of Texas Press. ISBN 978-0292704565.
- Bosch DT. (2002). The American Mission Hospitals in Oman, 1893-1974, 81 Years. Muscat, Oman. LCCN 2002331314.
- Calverley (M.D.), Eleanor T. (1958). My Arabian Days and Nights. Crowell.
- Dar al-Athar al-Islamiyyah. Kuwait and America: A Partnership Still Evolving. Kuwait City, Kuwait.
- Doumato, E. A. (2000). Getting God's Ear: Women, Islam, and Healing in Saudi Arabia and the Gulf. New York: Columbia University Press. ISBN 978-0-231-11667-1.
- Mary Bruins Allison to dear family. Dahanu Mission Hospital, statistics. Drexel University College of Medicine: Archives & Special Collection.
- Kuwait Women's Hospital, hospital statistics, 1933 - 1961. Papers of Mary Bruins Allison, M.D. 1934-1985 (ACC-215). Drexel University College of Medicine: Archives & Special Collection.
- Ismael, Jacqueline S. (1982). Kuwait, Social Change in Historical Perspective (First ed.). Syracuse, New York: Syracuse University Press. ISBN 978-0815622543.
- Joyce, Miriam (March 5, 2014). Kuwait, 1945-1996: An Anglo-American Perspective. Routledge. pp. xviii–xix. ISBN 978-1-135-22806-4.
- Scudder, L. R. (1998). The Arabian Mission's Story: In Search of Abraham's Other Son. Wm. B. Eerdmans Publishing Company. ISBN 978-0-8028-4616-7.
- United Nations Department of Economic and Social Affairs (1991), The World's Women 1970-1990, New York: United Nations
- Walls, Archie (1996), American Mission Hospital, UNDP, Kuwait. Dar Al-Athar Al-Islamiyyah
