= Robert Allison (South Dakota politician) =

American politician

Robert Allison was a member of the South Dakota House of Representatives.

== Biography ==
Allison was born on March 14, 1846, near Summit Center, Wisconsin, now in the village of Summit, in Waukesha County, Wisconsin. Allison was a sailor on the Great Lakes and later moved to Dakota Territory to help his brothers build houses. Allison was in farming and stock raising. He died on October 15, 1924, and is buried in Brookings, South Dakota.

== Career ==
Allison was a member of the House of Representatives from 1895 to 1896. He was a Republican and lived in Cavour, South Dakota.
