= Andy Allison =

American baseball player (1848–1897)

- First baseman
- Born: 1848; New York City, New York, U.S.
- Died: March 21, 1897 (aged 48–49); Brooklyn, New York, U.S.
- Batted: Unknown Threw: Unknown

MLB debut
- May 7, 1872, for the Brooklyn Eckfords

Last MLB appearance
- October 21, 1872, for the Brooklyn Eckfords

MLB statistics
- Games played: 24
- Runs scored: 11
- Hits: 15
- Batting average: .161
- Stats at Baseball Reference

Teams
- National Association of Base Ball Players Brooklyn Eckfords (1867–1870) National Association of Professional BBP Brooklyn Eckfords (1872)

Andrew Kent Allison (1848 – March 21, 1897) was an American professional baseball player who played first base in Major League Baseball for the 1872 Brooklyn Eckfords. He was the older brother of Eckfords teammate Bill Allison.

Allison was born in New York City, the son of Scottish immigrants James and Jane Allison. In 1871, he married Elizabeth Holzberger at Ainslie St Presbyterian Church in Brooklyn.
