= Peter Allison =

Australian writer

Peter Allison is an Australian writer whose books have focused on his time as an African safari guide, as well as his time in South America.

He currently lives in the United Kingdom with his wife Pru, and their two children. He works for Natural Selection as a salesman and safari guide for private groups. Peter hosts a less than serious podcast about animals and conservation called Deep in the Bush, a production of the Be The Uproar network.

Allison grew up in Sydney but at the age of 16 won a scholarship for study in Japan. At 19 he travelled to Africa and became a guide for Idube Game Reserve and then Wilderness Safaris.

His books have been compared to campfire tales relating stories of silly antics or perilous situations. Whatever You Do, Don't Run achieved best seller status.

== Bibliography ==
- Whatever You Do, Don't Run: True Tales of a Botswana Safari Guide, Lyons Press (Guilford, CT), 2008
- Don't Look behind You: A Safari Guide's Encounters with Ravenous Lions, Stampeding Elephants, and Lovesick Rhinos, Lyons Press (Guilford, CT), 2009
- Chasing the Jaguar forthcoming from Globe Pequot (North America) and Allen & Unwin (Australia/NZ)
- How To Walk a Puma: And Other Things I Learned While Stumbling Through South America, Lyons Press (Guilford, CT), 2012
