= Robin Allison =

New Zealand architect

- Education: University of Otago, University of Auckland
- Occupation: Architect

Robin Allison is a New Zealand architectural designer and the designer of a co-housing community in West Auckland. The community is New Zealand's first purpose-built co-housing development.

== Biography ==
Allison grew up in Bucklands Beach, Auckland. In 1973, she moved to Dunedin to study medicine at the University of Otago. She soon changed to study anthropology and psychology and then left university the following year. After some years working and travelling overseas, she moved back to Auckland and enrolled in architecture at the University of Auckland, starting her course in 1980.

Allison had two children while studying, and completed her degree in 1986. After graduating, she tutored in solar design at the University of Auckland. From 1990 to 1992, Allison worked for Housing New Zealand and wrote the guidelines for thermal performance and environmental performance for Housing New Zealand's revised code for the design of their housing units.

In 1993 she established her own sustainable architecture practice. Her residential projects featured passive solar building design principles and were designed using earth and untreated timber framing.

In 2008, Allison received a Winston Churchill Fellowship to study sustainable community and town centres in various Europe and the United States. She co-founded Yes In My Front Yard, Centre for Natural Building Technology in 2015, an advisory group specialising in knowledge of environmentally restorative materials and systems.

Allison is a fellow of the New Zealand Social Entrepreneur Fellowship.

=== Earthsong ===
In 1995, Allison initiated a project to develop a co-housing development located in Rānui, West Auckland, called Earthsong. She developed the project vision and group agreements around decision-making, group process and eco-design, as well as the construction aspects of managing contracts, budgets and detailed oversight of the building. The project was completed in 2008 and was the first co-housing development in New Zealand.

A former organic orchard was purchased by the group in 1999, and design of the development began. The neighbourhood was designed based on co-housing and permaculture principles. The development consists of 32 terrace houses and eco-apartments on 1.3 hectares of orchard land, and houses around 69 residents.

The neighbourhood was designed for sustainability utilising passive solar design, solar panels, and roof water collection and re-use. The houses are constructed with low energy materials such as rammed earth walls and locally sourced timber for exterior cladding and interiors. Individual homes of varying sizes, shared gardens, carparks, workshop, and a large central "Common House" make up the buildings within Earthsong. The common house includes a guest suite, shared laundry facilities, living and play areas, and a large kitchen which hosts community meals cooked by the residents. The community also shares the maintenance and care of the gardens and grounds.

Allison continues to consult and educate regarding co-housing with public tours of Earthsong, workshops, and academic seminars.

In 2020, Allison published a book describing the process of developing the community.

=== Publications ===
- Allison R. (2020). Cohousing for life: a practical and personal story of Earthsong Eco-neighbourhood. Mary Egan Publishing.
