= John W. Allison =

American singer, composer, lyricist, and collector of folk songs

John Blauvelt Allison (January 13, 1893 – October 1981) was an American artist, singer, composer, lyricist, and collector of folk songs. His collection of correspondence, radio scripts, clippings, scrapbooks, brochures, published music, and unpublished sound recordings is housed at the New York Public Library.
