= Bill Allison (baseball) =

American baseball player (died 1887)

- Utility player
- Born: c. 1850; New York City, New York, U.S.
- Died: January 25, 1887; Brooklyn, New York, U.S.
- Batted: Unknown Threw: Unknown

MLB debut
- May 21, 1872, for the Brooklyn Eckfords

Last MLB appearance
- July 4, 1872, for the Brooklyn Eckfords

MLB statistics
- Games played: 5
- Runs scored: 5
- Hits: 3
- Batting average: .143
- Stats at Baseball Reference

Teams
- National Association of Base Ball Players Brooklyn Eckfords (1870) National Association of Professional BBP Brooklyn Eckfords (1872)

William Andrew Allison (c. 1850 – January 25, 1887) was an American professional baseball player. In the National Association he was a substitute infielder for the 1872 Brooklyn Eckfords He was the younger brother of Eckfords teammate Andy Allison.

"Billy" Allison previously played for the Eckfords in the second of their four professional seasons, 1870. While the team won 2, tied 1, and lost 12 pro matches, he was one of the second basemen.

After his baseball career Bill Allison served one term as a Brooklyn city alderman, then was appointed an appraiser in the Custom House, a position which he held when he died of heart disease on January 25, 1887, in Brooklyn. He is interred at Cypress Hills Cemetery.
