= Emery Allison =

American politician (1894–1977)

Emery W. Allison (January 18, 1894 – September 1, 1977) was an American Democratic politician who served in the Missouri General Assembly. He served in the Missouri Senate from 1939 until 1947 and in the Missouri House of Representatives from 1921 until 1925.

Born in Maries County, Missouri, he was educated in public schools and at Missouri State Teachers College, in Warrensburg, Missouri. In December 1917, he married Catherine M. Allison in Rolla, Missouri. During World War I, he served in the infantry of the U.S. Army at Camp Funston, Kansas, and Camp Grant, Illinois. Harry Truman tied to get Allison elected to the U.S. Senate in 1950 saying, "I know Emery Allison very well. I like him, and I think he would make a wonderful United States Senator from Missouri." Emery W. Allison died September 1, 1977, at age 83, and his wife Catherine M. Allison died about two months later on November 4, 1977, at the age of 85.
