= William D. Allison =

American lawman (1861–1923)

- Born: William Davis Allison; 1861; Ohio, U.S.
- Died: April 1, 1923 (aged 61–62); Seminole, Texas, U.S.
- Occupation: Lawman

William Davis Allison (1861 – April 1, 1923) was an American lawman. He served as lieutenant in the service of the Arizona Rangers from 1903 to 1904.

== Biography ==
Allison was born in Ohio. He moved to Texas for which Allison was a cowboy and wrangler. He was sharp and liked by people for which he was nominated to become sheriff in Midland County, Texas. His nomination become successful for which Allison was marked as the youngest sheriff in Texas, in 1888. He served as the sheriff for ten years. Allison then served as the city marshal in Roswell, New Mexico. In 1903, he was hired by the second captain of the Arizona Rangers, Thomas H. Rynning to become an Arizona ranger. He served as lieutenant. Allison had previously served as an inspector in the Texas Cattle Raisers for three years. He then served as deputy sheriff in Chaves County, New Mexico.

Allison allegedly had killed Jack Dunlop in a train robbery in Fairbank, Arizona. He also seized two brothers who were outlaws. Allison had retired as a lieutenant for the Arizona Rangers in 1904, in which he settled in Texas. With settling in Texas, he extinguished Pascal Morosco. Allison specified as a "Special Texas Ranger", in 1917. He worked along with inspector, Horace L. Roberson on an examination. In 1923, they've both had to attend a grand jury for which they had both conferred evidence against their suspects, but it never happened. They both had met their attorneys at the Gaines Hotel for which in a while their suspects Milt Good and Tom Ross had carried a shotgun and a pistol. Allison and Roberson were both killed by their suspects, in which Allison's body was on the floor in April 1923 in Seminole, Texas. Roberson's wife had heard the shooting.
