= Henry Allison (cricketer) =

Australian cricketer (1828–1881)

Personal information
- Full name: Henry Allison
- Born: 14 July 1828; Campbell Town, Van Diemen's Land
- Died: 12 May 1881 (aged 52); Coupeville, Washington, United States

Domestic team information
- Years: Team
- 1851–1858: Tasmania

Career statistics
Competition	First-class
Matches	2
Runs scored	4
Batting average	1.00
100s/50s	0/0
Top score	2
Catches/stumpings	1/–
- Source: Cricket Archive, 5 November 2010

Henry Allison (born 14 July 1828 in Campbell Town, Van Diemen's Land), was an Australian cricket player, who played two first-class cricket matches for Tasmania.

He died on 12 May 1881 in Coupeville, Washington, United States at the age of 52.

== See also ==
- List of Tasmanian representative cricketers
