= Will Allison =

American novelist and editor

- Born: 1968 (age 57–58); Columbia, South Carolina, U.S.
- Occupation: Novelist
- Website: willallison.com

Will Allison (born 1968) is an American novelist and editor. He is the author of the New York Times bestselling book Long Drive Home (2011). His debut novel was What You Have Left (2007).

== Early life and education ==
Allison was born in Columbia, South Carolina. He graduated from Case Western Reserve University in 1991 with a degree in English and political science, and then went on to Ohio State University to receive his MA in English and MFA in creative writing.

== Career ==
Allison is a contributing editor for One Story magazine and has also served as the executive editor of Story and editor-at-large for Zoetrope: All-Story. He has taught creative writing at the Ohio State University, Butler University, and Indiana University-Purdue University at Indianapolis. He was an adjunct assistant professor in Columbia University’s MFA creative writing program.

He has published short fiction in American Short Fiction, Atlanta Magazine, The Cincinnati Review, The Florida Review, Glimmer Train, The Kenyon Review, One Story, Shenandoah, Zoetrope: All-Story, and elsewhere.

Long Drive Home was named one of The Daily Beast’s Top 5 “Perfect Summer Read” in August 2011 and became a New York Times bestseller.

== Works ==
- What You Have Left (2007)
- Long Drive Home (2011)
