= Murray Springs Clovis Site =

Archaeological site in Arizona, United States

- U.S. National Register of Historic Places
- U.S. National Historic Landmark
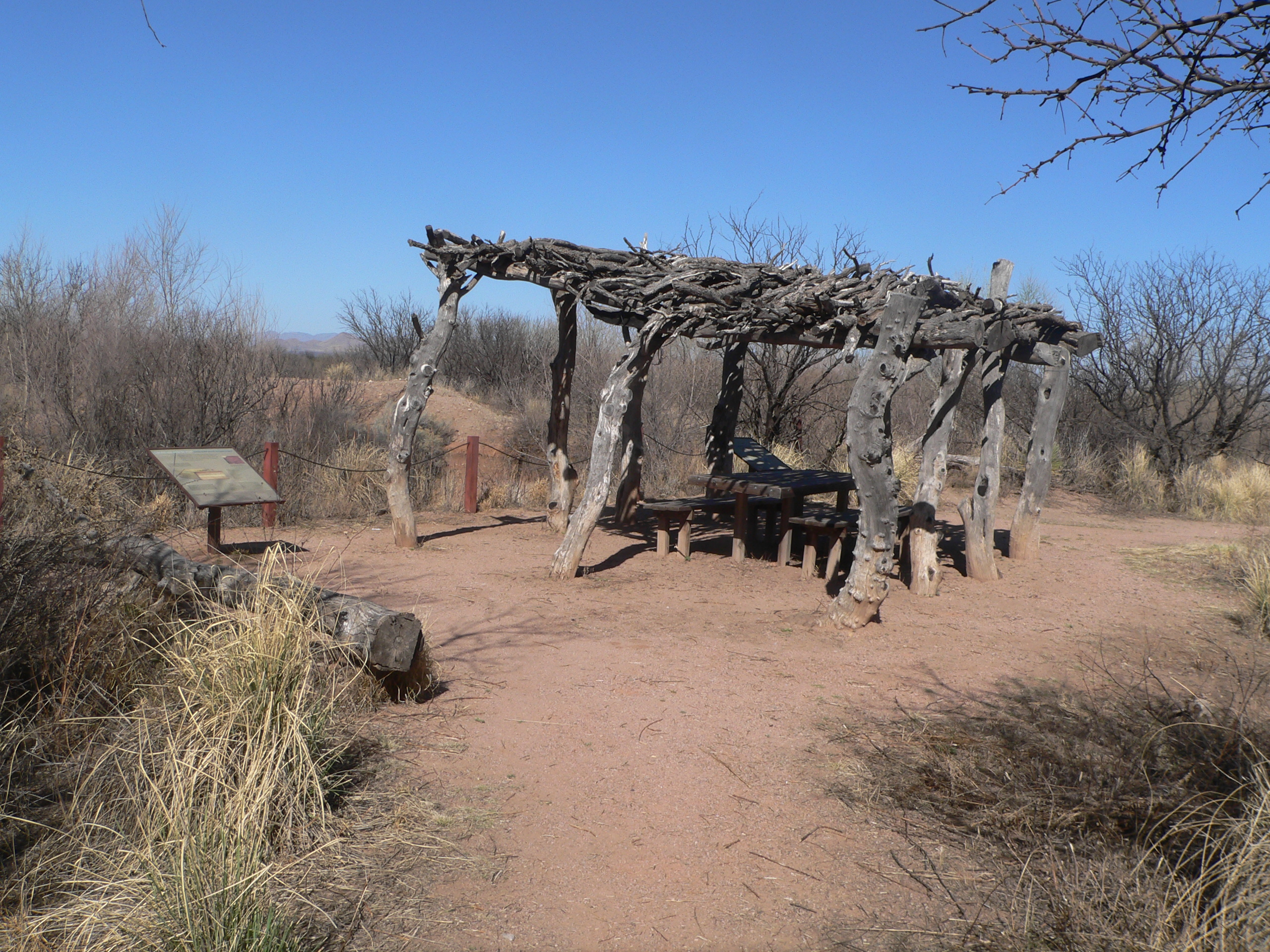
- Ramada on interpretive trail

- Location within Arizona
- Nearest city: Sierra Vista, Arizona
- Coordinates: 31.570804°N 110.178697°W
- Website: Murray Springs Clovis Site
- NRHP reference No.: 12001019
- Designated NHL: 2012

Murray Springs is located in southern Arizona near the San Pedro River and once served as a Clovis hunting camp approximately 11,000 years BP. The site is unique for the massive quantity of large megafauna processing and extensive tool making. Archaeologists identified five buried animal kills and processing locations and a Clovis camp location. The site is located in the San Pedro Riparian National Conservation Area, administered by the Bureau of Land Management.

== Archaeology ==
In 1966, archaeologists C. Vance Haynes and Peter Mehringer of the University of Arizona discovered the site while extending the mapping of the area of the Lehner Mammoth Kill Site 19 kilometers to the south. The archaeologists located two concentrations of mammoth bones that day. They were convinced the area was a Clovis site based on the bones and because Murray Springs shared the same geologic characteristics as the Lehner site. Funding by the National Science Foundation and the National Geographic Society enabled excavations from 1967 to 1971. Some of the significant artifacts found during the excavations included hearths, a bone tool, projectile points, lithic tools, and debitage. The bone tool is believed to be a shaft straightener. The five buried animal kills and processing locations contained bones of mammoth, bison, horses, camels, canids and rodents. A worker found a single pot sherd on the surface of the site that was associated to use approximately 1300 to 1450 CE. The archaeologists noted peoples have used the spring over an extended period. An analysis of the site is interpreted as leaning against the extraterrestrial impact theory of the Pleistocene Extinction.

The San Pedro River Valley is rich in discovered Clovis culture sites. Within a 50-mile radius are nearly a dozen Clovis sites including the Lehner Mammoth Kill Site, the Naco Mammoth Kill Site, the Escapule Clovis Site and the Leikem Clovis Site. The Department of the Interior, Bureau of Land Management oversees Murray Springs and in 2012, the U.S. Government declared the site a National Historic Landmark. The site has a parking area and an interpretive trail.

== See also ==
- List of National Historic Landmarks in Arizona
- National Register of Historic Places listings in Cochise County, Arizona
