= Hereford, Arizona =

Unincorporated community in the state of Arizona, United States

- Populated place
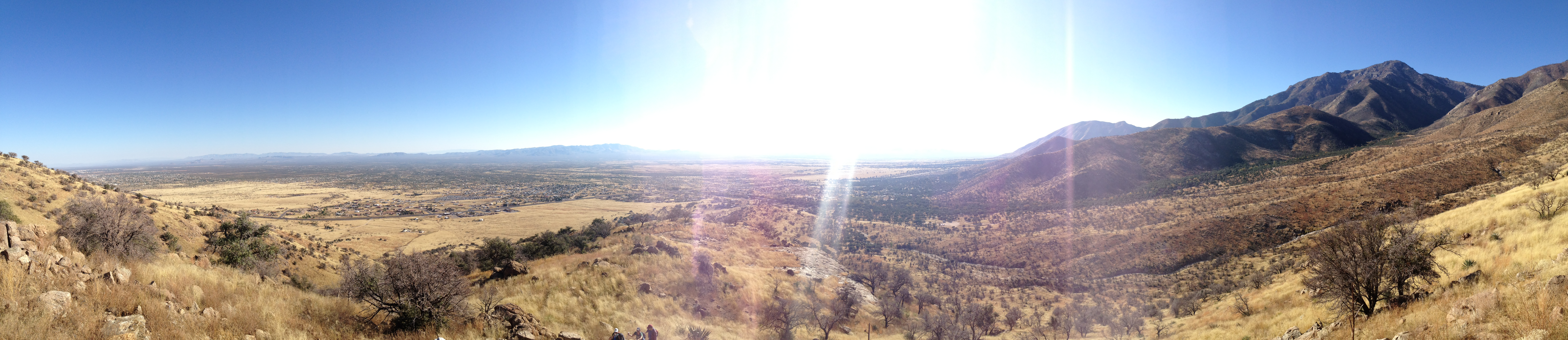
- Panaramic View of Miller Canyon
- Interactive map of Hereford, Arizona
- Coordinates: 31°26′18″N 110°05′52″W
- Country: United States
- State: Arizona
- County: Cochise
- unincorporated community: 1895–1900
- Elevation: 4,193 ft (1,278 m)
- Time zone: UTC-7 (MST (no daylight saving time))
- ZIP code: 85615
- Area code: 520
- GNIS feature ID: 5733

Hereford is a populated place in Cochise County along the San Pedro Riparian National Conservation Area in the southern part of the U.S. state of Arizona. It is southeast of Sierra Vista and is a part of the Sierra Vista-Douglas micropolitan area. The elevation is 4,193 feet at the location of the original townsite at the far eastern end of the unincorporated area; the residential area runs for another 8 miles west from this location, blending into the unincorporated area of Nicksville at an elevation of approximately 4800 feet. Hereford Station Post Office is located at the far western end of Nicksville, at the foot of the Huachuca Mountains.

== History ==
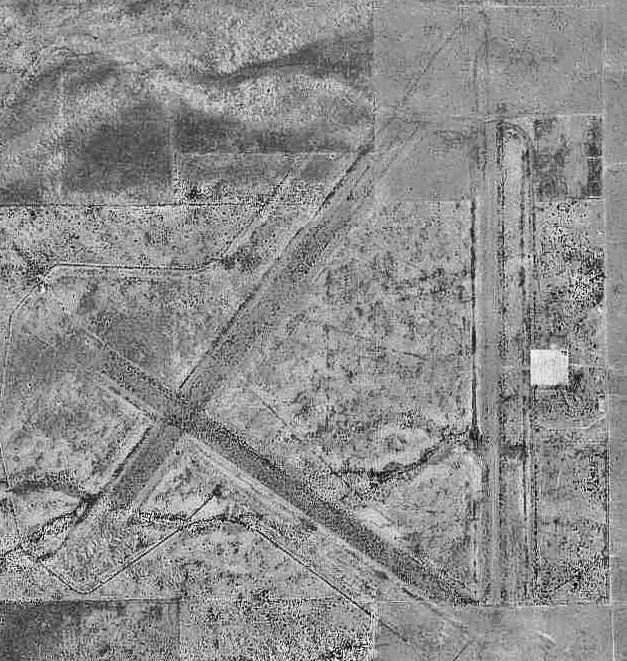
Hereford Army Airfield

Founded in 1878, the community was named after Frank Hereford, who was a friend of the town's founder, and a distinguished local attorney. It was where cowboys Frank McLaury and Tom McLaury first met and became associated with Ike Clanton, in 1878. The two brothers would later be killed during the Gunfight at the O.K. Corral, in Tombstone, Arizona, with Ike Clanton being at the center of that dispute with the Earp faction. Johnny Ringo and Curly Bill lived nearby and grew up with the Clantons. John Slaughter's ranch was just under two miles south of Hereford, and was a favorite for cattle stealing raids by the Clanton Ranch.

The El Paso and Southwestern Railroad, a mining road originally built by Phelps Dodge Mining Corporation, established a siding at the town around 1892, which featured a water tank and stock loading platforms. In the 1890s the Greene Cattle Company, after Colonel William C. Greene its owner, who bought the San Rafael del Valle, Spanish land grant. It comprised a general store/post office, railroad station, school, saloon, adobe houses, and his mansion. It was the largest cattle ranch in the Valley. His Stepson Frank Moson designed and created the Hereford Corrals for shipping to fulfill their shipping needs for the ranch. Frank Moson was also the founder/owner of the Y-Lightning Ranch of old west notoriety.

This line continued on to the wye connection at Fairbank and the New Mexico and Arizona Railroad, and then on to Benson. Hereford was a common stop for travelers heading from Tombstone, 15 miles northeast, down the San Pedro River en route to Naco, Arizona and thence Mexico, approximately 14 miles away. The original townsite was populated until the 1950s, and the last structures disappeared in the early 1960s. Nothing remains of the original townsite except for a few concrete foundations and the ballasted rail bed, the rails and ties having been pulled in 2006.

Also nearby are remains of the former Hereford Army Airfield, a World War II-era training field for light and medium bomber pilots. Little remains other than one concrete pad and traces of the runway tarmac in the bushes.

The area is known for its wildlife and outdoor activities. Hundreds of birds and butterflies migrate through this area year round. The entry turnoff to the Coronado National Memorial is located in Hereford. The Lehner Mammoth-Kill Site, a National Historic Landmark, is located nearby.

Hereford has the ZIP Code of 85615; according to the 2020–2024 American Community Survey 5-year estimates, ZIP Code Tabulation Area (ZCTA) 85615 had a population of 10,175.

== Climate ==
According to the Köppen Climate Classification system, Hereford has a semi-arid climate, abbreviated "BSk" on climate maps.

== See also ==
- A. A. Allen
- Hereford Army Airfield
- Miller Peak (Arizona)
- San Pedro and Southwestern Railroad
