= Vance Haynes =

American archaeologist (born 1928)

- Born: Caleb Vance Haynes Jr. February 29, 1928 (age 98); Spokane, Washington, U.S.
- Education: Colorado School of Mines
- Known for: Murray Springs Clovis Site; Tule Springs Archaeological Site; Sandia Cave
- Scientific career
- Fields: Geology, archaeology
- Workplaces: University of Arizona; Southern Methodist University
- Doctoral advisor: Terah L. Smiley; Paul E. Damon; John F. Lance; Spencer R. Titley

Caleb Vance Haynes Jr. (born February 29, 1928) is an American archaeologist, geologist and author who specializes in the archaeology of the American Southwest. Haynes "revolutionized the fields of geoarchaeology and archaeological geology." He is known for unearthing and studying artifacts of Paleo-Indians including ones from Sandia Cave in the 1960s, work which helped to establish the timeline of human migration through North America. Haynes coined the term "black mat" for a layer of 10,000-year-old swamp soil seen in many North American archaeological studies.

Haynes was elected in 1990 to the National Academy of Sciences. From 1996 to 2004, Haynes worked to keep the Kennewick Man discovery available for science. Currently an emeritus Regents' professor at the University of Arizona, Haynes is still active in the School of Anthropology.

== Early life ==
Caleb Vance Haynes Jr. was born in 1928 on February 29, Leap Day, in Spokane, Washington. He was the only child of his parents, Marjory McLeod and Caleb Vance Haynes, an air officer, commander of a military airfield, who would later rise to the rank of major general in the United States Air Force (USAF).

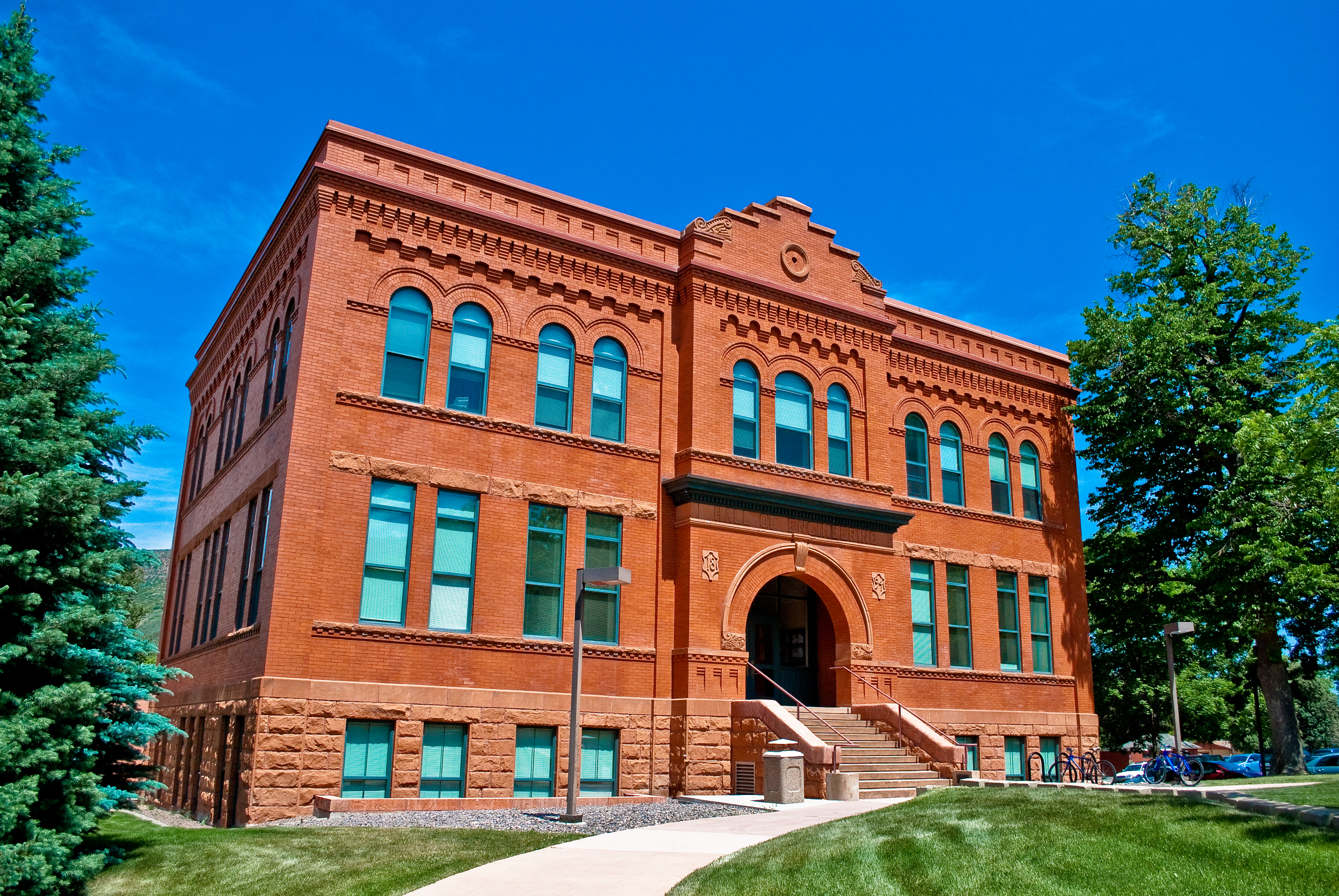
Colorado School of Mines

One of Haynes's grandfathers was Caleb Hill Haynes Jr., a Democrat in the North Carolina General Assembly. Haynes's most famous great-grandfather was Chang Bunker, a twin of the first pair of conjoined twins to be called "Siamese Twins".

Haynes enrolled in the Colorado School of Mines, studying Geologic Engineering (with the Mining Option) for two years. Like his father, Haynes entered the USAF; he served for almost four years 1951–1954. During this time, he was posted to air bases in Fairbanks, Austin, El Paso and in Albuquerque. At each station he indulged his interest in archaeology, and sought contact with some of the early researchers studying Paleoindian traces. He was interested in rocketry and guided missiles, and was posted to special weapons units, including a stint at Sandia Base adjoining Albuquerque. In the Albuquerque area on his days off, he explored early human settlement sites with an Air Force colleague. After his military stint, Haynes returned to the Colorado School of Mines, earning his Bachelor of Science degree in geology and archaeology in 1956.

== Archaeology ==
Attracted by the school's program in geochronology, Haynes entered the University of Arizona at Tucson for graduate study. As well, he was drawn by the Paleoindian research being performed by Emil Haury. Under Haury, Haynes and professor George Agogino began in 1960 to gather charcoal samples from many sites of ancient human activity in the Great Plains, returning to the university's new radiocarbon dating equipment to process the samples and establish as narrow a time range as possible. From this work, Haynes established the first reliable dates for the Folsom tradition and the Clovis culture.

Later, Haynes became one of the leading proponents and defenders of 'Clovis first' theory. Haynes has been critical of all proposed pre-Clovis sites for failure to provide unequivocal evidence and to consider alternative hypotheses.

He earned his PhD in 1965, and joined in archaeological digs at Hell Gap and Sister's Hill in Wyoming. Fred Wendorf invited Haynes to join the High Plains Paleoecology Project (HPPP), an association which led to his first work at the Clovis archaeological dig, Blackwater Draw Locality 1. His careful dating of Clovis carbon traces provided Haynes with one of the most significant advances in the understanding of early human activity and migration in North America.

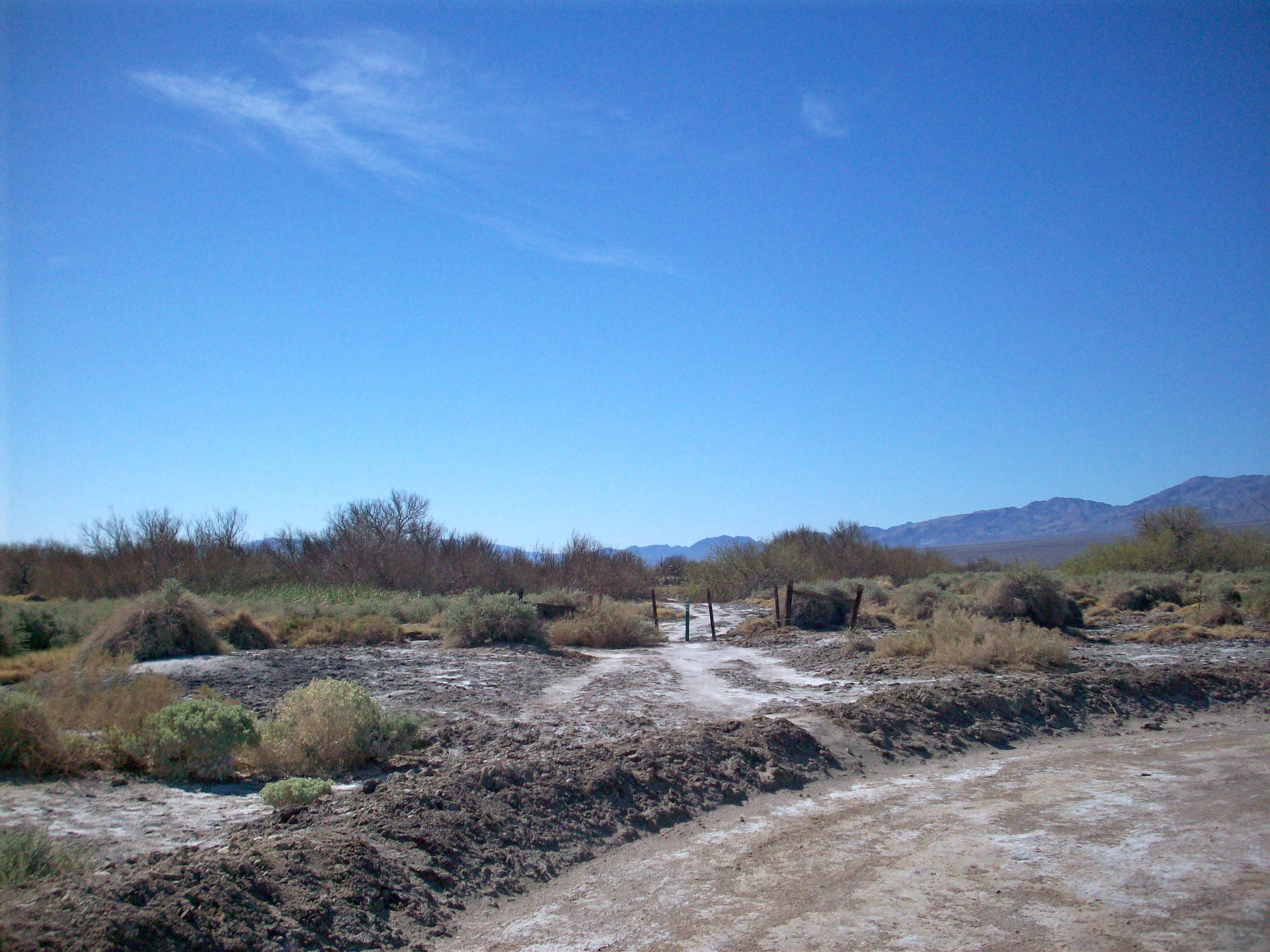
Tule Springs Archaeological Site

Haynes has primarily been interested in determining how the New World was populated by humans. Other interests of his include studies of the Quaternary extinction event, the Pleistocene–Holocene transition in which megafauna died off in great numbers. Haynes has studied both modern and historic climate change, human occupation of the Sahara, and battlefield archaeology.

Haynes has studied the disappearance from Earth of its largest animals approximately 11,000–10,900 years ago. Haynes questions the theorists who say humans killed off the large mammals by predation, as well as the theorists who look to an asteroid impact. He suspects it was a combination of drought and human predation as animals concentrated at watering places as per Jelinek (1967). Haynes notes that the extinction period could have been as short as one century—he concludes that too little is known, and more research must be undertaken to achieve complete understanding.

In 1997, Haynes co-authored a memorial of his teacher Emil Haury, an article written with Raymond Harris Thompson and James Jefferson Reid which appeared in Biographical Memoirs, Volume 72, of the National Academy of Sciences.

On September 28, 1999, some 90 former students of Haynes converged at the University of Arizona to honor him during a two-day symposium.

The Argonaut Archaeological Research Fund (AARF) was the recipient in Fall 2002 of Haynes's extensive collection of 800 mostly epoxy resin, with some acrylic, casts made from Paleoindian projectile points. The collection is housed at the School of Anthropology at the University of Arizona.

In 2003–2004, Haynes submitted arguments to the United States Court of Appeals for the Ninth Circuit with other scientists to question various tribal claims to the remains of the Kennewick Man, estimated to be 8,340 to 9,200 years old, in order to determine which tribe, if any, it could be identified with. The remains in question were ones that Haynes said predated any organized tribes currently known, and as such could not be considered the direct ancestor of any of the tribes who sought to have the bone fragments immediately reburied. Writing to the Army Corps of Engineers on October 3, 1996, Haynes was one of the first scientists to question the rights of the several Native American tribes wishing to take possession of the skeleton and to rebury it—he argued that the skeleton should be studied by qualified scientists. In mid-October, he and seven other scientists sued to gain access to the skeleton, and to prevent its "repatriation" with Indian tribes. The court concluded that the Kennewick Man could not be considered "Native American" as defined by the Native American Graves Protection and Repatriation Act.

=== Geoarchaeology of Egypt ===
In the 1960s, Haynes began research into geoarchaeology of middle and late Paleolithic sites in the Western Desert of Egypt and Sudan. He investigated the geochronology of playas, landscape evolution, processes of sand movement, and other relevant subjects. In this, he was influenced by the work of Ralph Bagnold.

He also documented previously unknown Paleolithic sites and the historic camps of early desert travelers. Some of this work is presented in a special issue of the journal Geoarchaeology (January 2001, volume 16, number 1).

=== "Black mat" layers ===
In the 1950s, in his work on the Lehner Mammoth-Kill Site near Hereford, Arizona, Emil Haury found Clovis point artifacts buried by a distinctive black clay layer. It was then known as "Lehner swamp soil". This black soil was associated with a subhumid climate and ponding.

Later, Haynes studied this phenomenon, and renamed it as “black mat”. Radiocarbon dates indicate that it formed between 9,800 and 10,800 BP.

Over 60 geoarchaeological sites bridging the Pleistocene–Holocene transition (last deglaciation) exhibit this "black mat"; it is a black organic-rich layer in the form of mollic paleosols, aquolls, and diatomites. This layer is associated with the Younger Dryas cooling episode ~10,900 B.P. to ~10,000 B.P., and covers the surfaces on which the last remnants of the terminal Pleistocene megafauna are recorded.

According to Haynes, 'black mat' is a general term that also includes the similar other deposits of various shades of grey or even white, because some Younger Dryas marls and diatomites are actually white to grey in color. Firestone and colleagues published an Inner Traditions trade book about cosmic catastrophes in which they claimed that raised levels of radioactivity were associated with the mat at the Murray Springs Clovis Site. But Haynes found no such radioactive anomaly of the black mat or the Pleistocene-Holocene boundary that it covers at Murray Springs, Lehner Ranch, or Blackwater Draw. Astrophysicist David Morrison later characterized Firestone's book as "catastrophist pseudoscience"

In the late 1990s, it was reported that, in the North American Great Basin area, black mats actually occur between 11,000 and 6300 BP (cal). Also, some had occurred post-2300 BP (cal). However, there's an extensive cluster of them near 10,000 BP.

This Rancholabrean termination or extinction is now dated at 10,900 ± 50 B.P.

== Personal life ==
While stationed with the USAF in Fairbanks, Alaska, Haynes met and married Elizabeth "Taffy" Hamilton. She previously broke codes for the U.S. Army in California, then moved to Fairbanks to work as a civil servant for the USAF. In 1955, while living in Denver, they had a daughter, Elizabeth Anne "Lisa" Haynes. In the late 1960s, Taffy earned a Bachelor of Arts degree in Journalism from the University of Arizona. She died in 2003, and was memorialized by her family with a leaf tile and a brick paver at the University of Arizona's Women's Plaza of Honor.

A hobby of Haynes is the collecting and researching the design and development of the elegant Springfield Officers Model Rifle (OMR), 1875-1885, by the National Armory at Springfield, Massachusetts. This was to replace the tedious customizing of sporting rifles by production of a standard model for officers to use on campaigns during the Indian wars in the west. This was for hunting to supplement the bland diet of salt pork and hardtack for the troops in the field.

Haynes also contributed to battlefield archaeology and geology for the National Park Service at the Little Bighorn, Washita, and Yellowstone battlefields, 1868-1877.

== Writings ==
- Haynes, C. Vance Jr. (August 13, 1982) "Great Sand Sea and Selima Sand Sheet, Eastern Sahara: Geochronology of Desertification." Science, Volume 217, Number 4560, pages 629–633.
- Haynes, C. Vance Jr. (September 1985) Mastodon-Bearing Springs and Late Quaternary Geochronology of the Lower Pomme de Terre Valley, Missouri. ISBN 978-0-8137-2204-7
- Haynes, C. Vance Jr. and George A. Agogino (1986) Geochronology of Sandia Cave. Smithsonian contributions to anthropology, Number 32. Washington, DC: Smithsonian Institution Press.
- Haynes, C. Vance Jr. (1995) General Custer and His Sporting Rifles. Tucson: Westernlore Publications.
- Haynes, C. Vance Jr., editor. (February 2007) Murray Springs: A Clovis Site with Multiple Activity Areas in the San Pedro Valley, Arizona. ISBN 978-0-8165-2579-9
