= Elgin, Arizona =

CDP in Santa Cruz County, Arizona

- Census-designated place
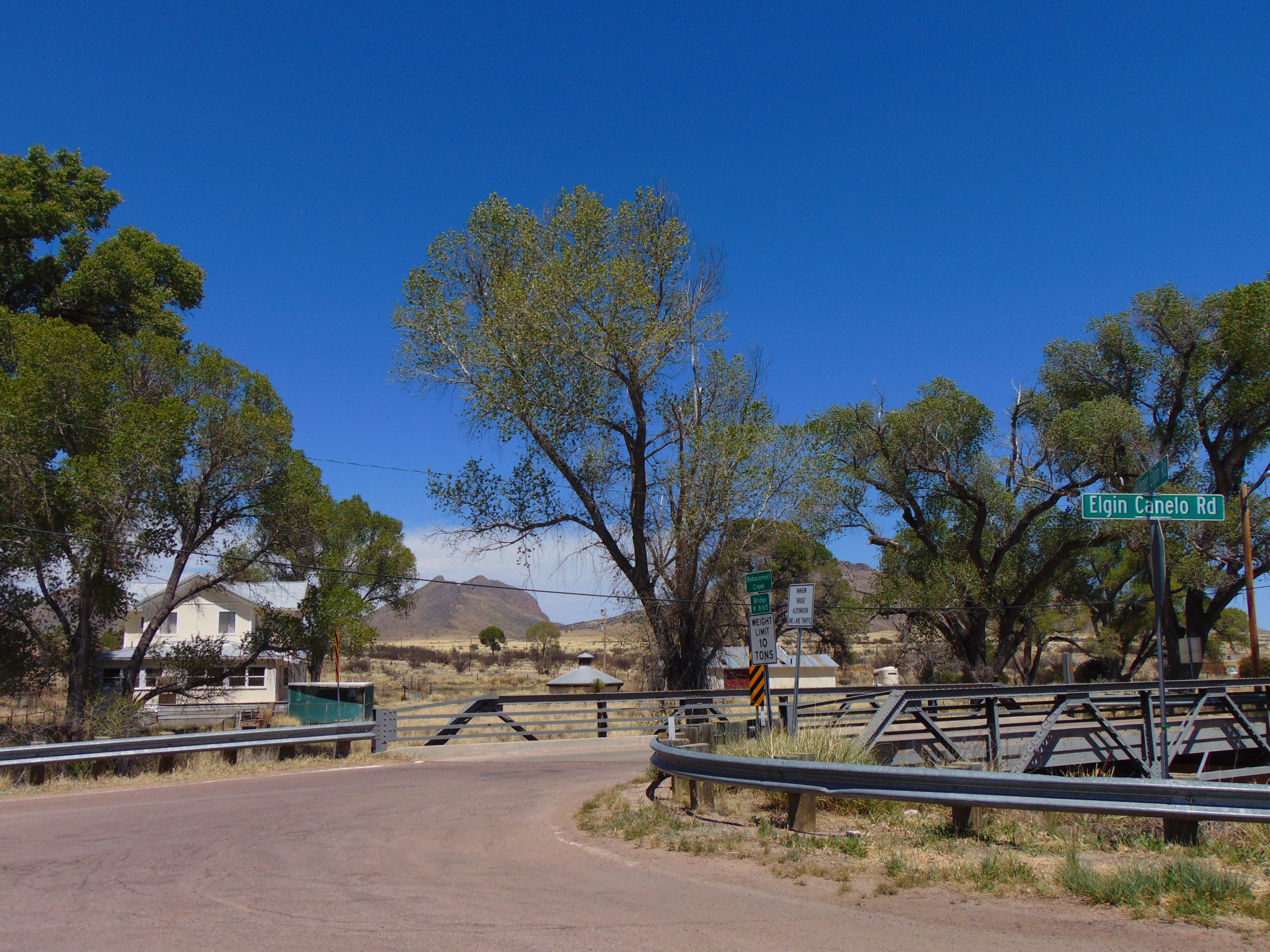
- View across Babocomari Creek toward the site of the railroad depot.

- Location in Santa Cruz County and the state of Arizona

- Location in the United States Elgin (Arizona)
- Coordinates: 31°37′45″N 110°34′19″W
- Country: United States
- State: Arizona
- County: Santa Cruz

Area
  - Total: 5.95 sq mi (15.41 km^{2})
  - Land: 5.95 sq mi (15.40 km^{2})
  - Water: 0 sq mi (0.00 km^{2})
- Elevation: 4,728 ft (1,441 m)

Population (2020)
  - Total: 162
  - Density: 27.2/sq mi (10.52/km^{2})
- Time zone: UTC-7 (MST (no DST))
- ZIP code: 85611
- Area code: 520
- FIPS code: 04-22150
- GNIS feature ID: 28852

Elgin is a census-designated place (CDP) in Santa Cruz County, Arizona, United States. The population was 161 at the 2010 census.

== Geography ==
Elgin is located along the Babocomari River at 31°37′45″N 110°34′19″W (31.629095, -110.571951). The Babocomari is known to harbor a unique species of fish, belonging to the family Characidae. They are incredibly rare and little is known about them. According to the United States Census Bureau, the CDP has a total area of 5.9 square miles (15.4 km^{2}), all land.

=== Climate ===
According to the Köppen Climate Classification system, Elgin has a semi-arid climate, abbreviated "BSk" on climate maps.

== Demographics ==
Historical population
Census	Pop.	Note	%±
2020	162		—
U.S. Decennial Census

As of the census of 2000, there were 309 people, 123 households, and 86 families residing in the CDP. The population density was 6.4 inhabitants per square mile (2.5/km^{2}). There were 153 housing units at an average density of 3.2 per square mile (1.2/km^{2}). The racial makeup of the CDP was 92% White, 3% Native American, 3% from other races, and 2% from two or more races. 14% of the population were Hispanic or Latino of any race.

There were 123 households, out of which 29% had children under the age of 18 living with them, 64% were married couples living together, 4% had a female householder with no husband present, and 29% were non-families. 24% of all households were made up of individuals, and 3% had someone living alone who was 65 years of age or older. The average household size was 2.5 and the average family size was 3.0.

In the CDP, the population was spread out, with 27% under the age of 18, 4% from 18 to 24, 25% from 25 to 44, 32% from 45 to 64, and 13% who were 65 years of age or older. The median age was 43 years. For every 100 females, there were 116 males. For every 100 females age 18 and over, there were 100 males.

The median income for a household in the CDP was $64,167, and the median income for a family was $66,250. Males had a median income of $38,500 versus $21,250 for females. The per capita income for the CDP was $27,909. About 10% of families and 13% of the population were below the poverty line, including 21% of those under the age of eighteen and 7% of those 65 or over.

== Film ==
Red River (1948) - This film, starring John Wayne and Montgomery Clift, used Elgin as the site of most of the exterior shots of the cattle drive.

Oklahoma! (1955) - The train station sequence in this musical film classic, with Gene Nelson singing and dancing the song "Kansas City" partly atop a moving train, was filmed in Elgin.

3:10 to Yuma (1957) - The railroad scenes in this western, with Glenn Ford and Van Heflin, were filmed in Elgin.

The Sons of Katie Elder (1965) - In the opening scene of this film, which also starred John Wayne, used the same train station and a few of the same camera angles as the Oklahoma film.

== Winemaking ==
Elgin is the first location in Arizona to engage in commercial scale winemaking. In the 1970s, Gordon Dutt, Ph.D., a soil scientist from the University of Arizona, was intrigued with the similarity between the soil of the Elgin-Sonoita area and that of Burgundy, France. In partnership with A. Blake Brophy, he developed an experimental winery that later developed into the Sonoita Vineyards and that encouraged other vineyards in the area. Presently, growers in the area produce Chardonnay, Sauvignon Blanc, Cabernet Sauvignon, Merlot, Pinot Noir, Mission, and Syrah grapes. In 2009 there were nine vineyards in the region, producing about 50,000 gallons of wine yearly.

Elgin hosts several wine festivals throughout the year, most notably the St. Martin's Day festival and the Fall festival.

The expansion of winemaking in the Elgin-Sonoita area has led to establishment of fine restaurants and bed and breakfasts and has regenerated the economy of this lightly populated, rural area.

== Gallery ==
Elgin Community Club building.

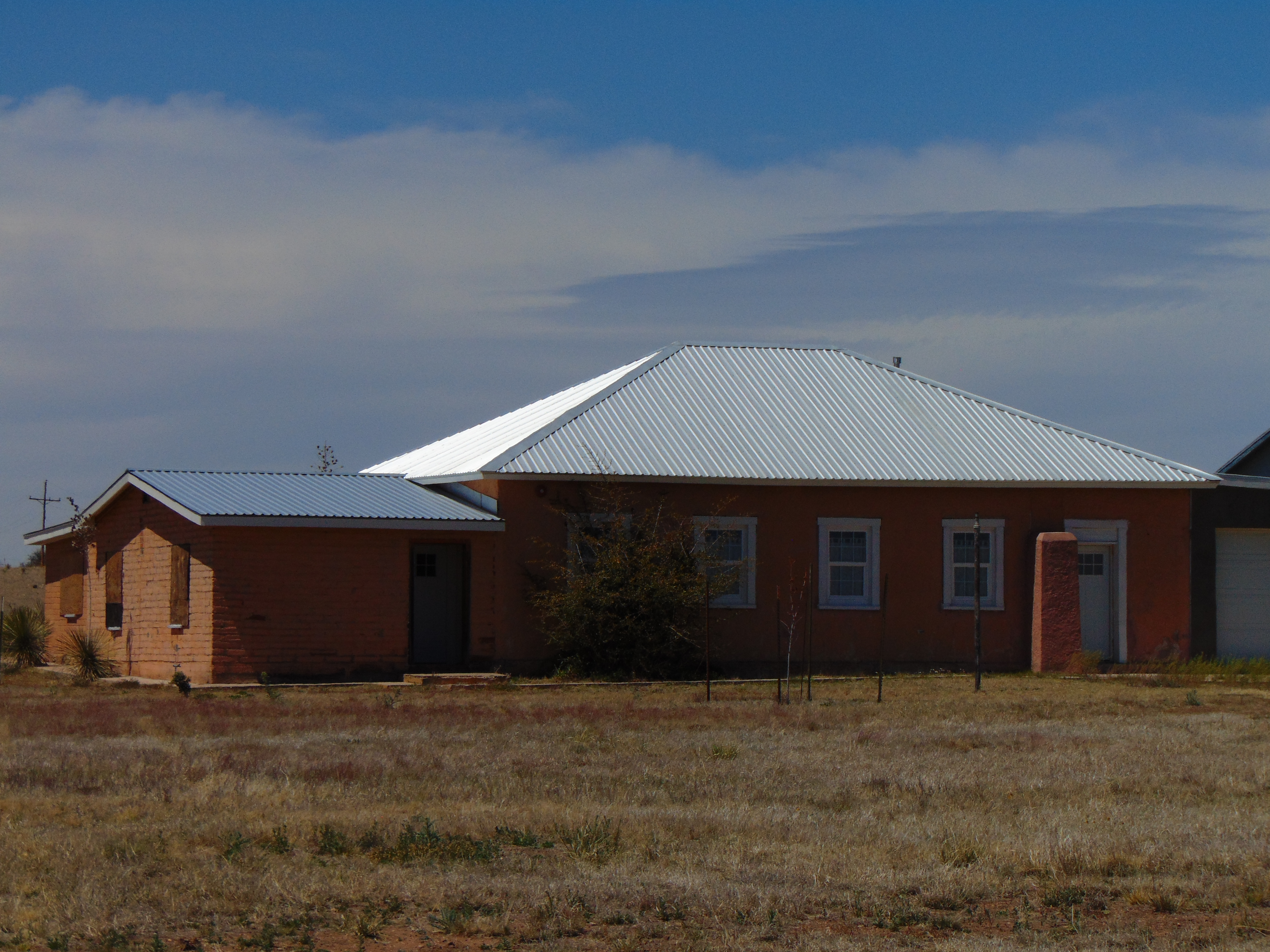
The historic 1915 schoolhouse was also used as a dance hall.

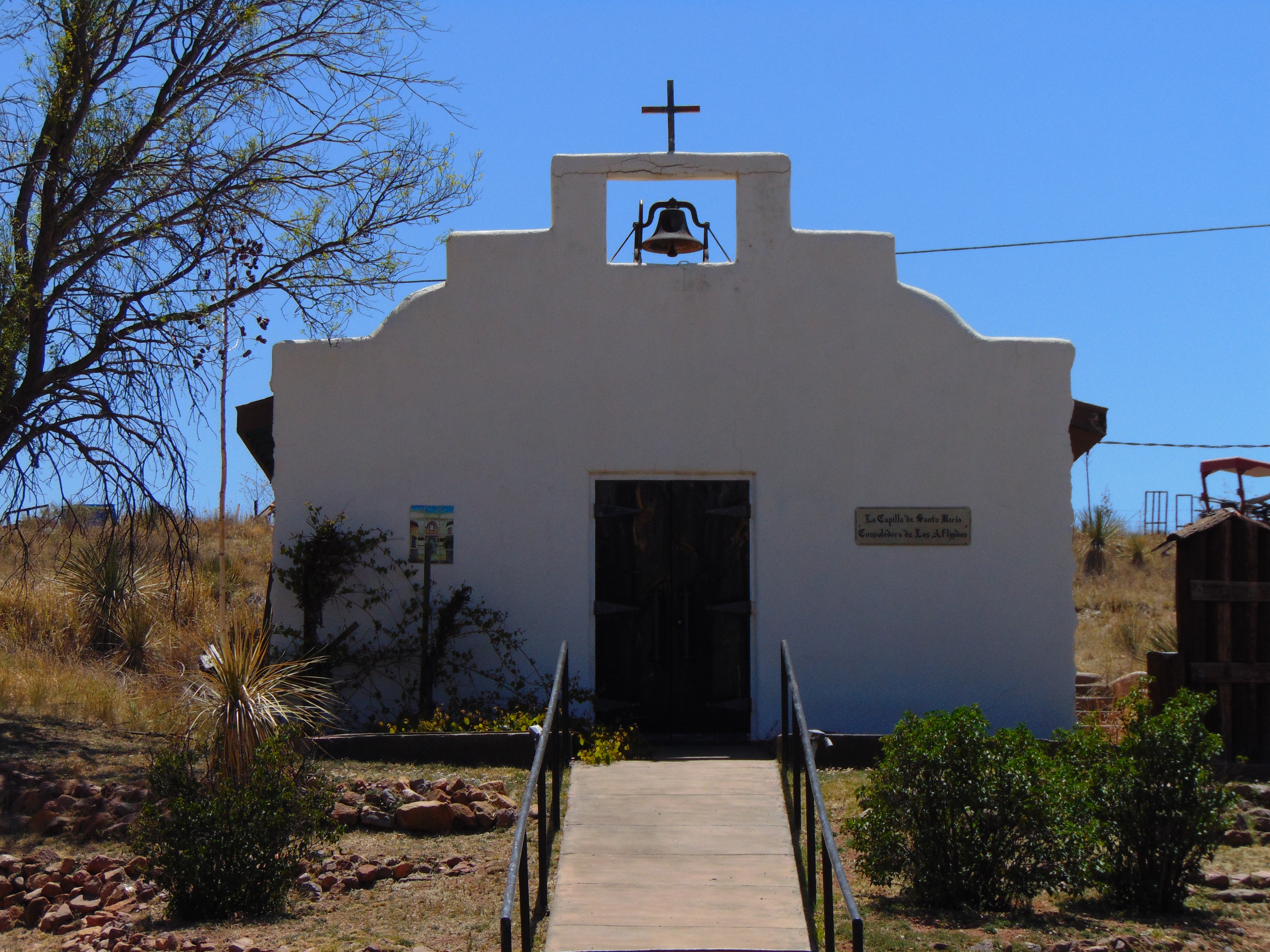
The Chapel of Santa Maria Catholic church in Elgin.

Former New Mexico & Arizona Railroad section house.

Historic service station building.
