= Babocomari River =

Tributary of the San Pedro River in Arizona

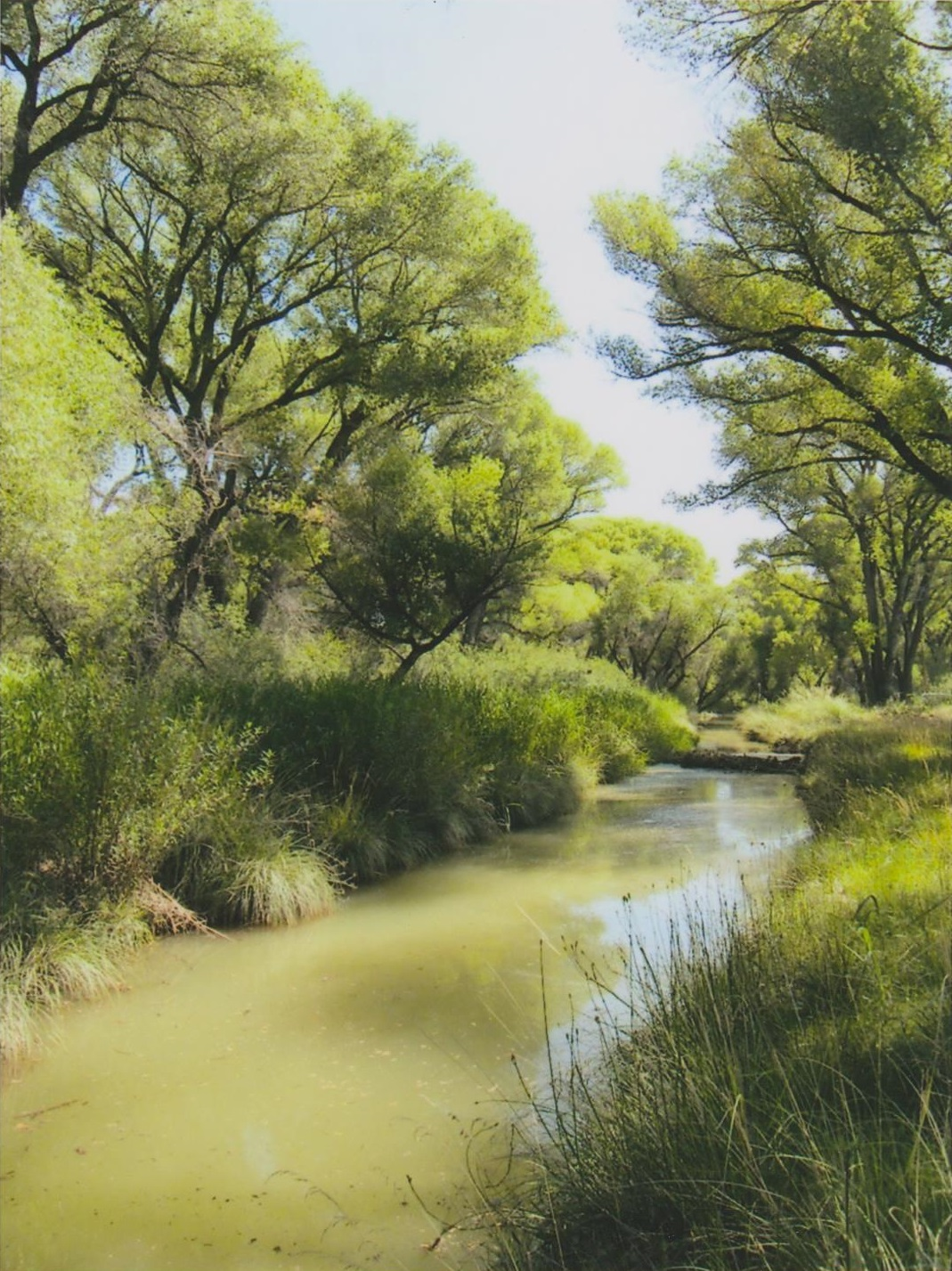
- The Babocomari River in 2014.

Location
- Country: United States
- Location: Santa Cruz and Cochise Counties, Arizona

Physical characteristics
- Source
  - location: Sonoita Basin
- Mouth
  - location: San Pedro River, Fairbank, Arizona
  - coordinates: 31°43′20″N 110°11′38″W
  - elevation: 3,825 ft (1,166 m)
- Length: 25 mi (40 km)

Basin features
- River system: Colorado River

The Babocomari River is a major tributary of the upper San Pedro River in southeastern Arizona. The river begins in the Sonoita Basin near the community of Elgin, Arizona, and flows eastward for approximately 25 miles (40 km) before merging with the San Pedro, just south of the Fairbank Historic Townsite in the San Pedro Riparian National Conservation Area. The Babocomari drains an area of about 310 square miles (800 km^{2}), including the northern Huachuca Mountains, the northwestern Canelo Hills, and the southern Mustang Mountains, and is one of three drainages of the Sonoita Basin, the other two being Sonoita Creek and Cienega Creek. Vegetation consists of riparian trees along the main channel and small marshy grasslands.

== See also ==
- List of rivers of Arizona
