= Naco Mammoth Kill Site =

Archaeological site in Arizona, United States

- U.S. National Register of Historic Places
- Nearest city: Naco, Arizona
- NRHP reference No.: 76002285
- Added to NRHP: July 21, 1976

The Naco Mammoth Kill Site is an archaeological site in southeast Arizona, 1 mile northwest of Naco in Cochise County. The site was reported to the Arizona State Museum in September 1951 by Marc Navarrete, a local resident, after his father found two Clovis points in Greenbush Draw (eroded by the Greenbush Creek, a tributary of the San Pedro river), while digging out the fossil bones of a mammoth. Emil Haury excavated the Naco mammoth site in April 1952. In only five days, Haury recovered the remains of a Columbian Mammoth in association with 8 Clovis points (including the 2 originally found by the Navarettes). The excavator believed the assemblage to date from about 10,000 years Before Present. An additional point was found in the arroyo upstream. The Naco site was the first Clovis mammoth kill association to be identified in Arizona. An additional, unpublished, second excavation occurred in 1953 which doubled the area of the original work and found bones from a 2nd mammoth. In 2020, small charcoal fragments were found adhered to a mammoth bone from the site. AMS radiocarbon dating produced a mean date of 10,985 ± 56 years Before Present.

Emil Haury (right) at Naco mammoth kill site, 1952, photograph courtesy Arizona State Museum, University of Arizona.

A Clovis point in situ amidst mammoth bones at the Naco site, 1952, photograph courtesy Arizona State Museum, University of Arizona.

== See also ==
- Lehner Mammoth-Kill Site
