= Lehner Mammoth-Kill Site =

Archaeological site in Arizona, United States

- U.S. National Register of Historic Places
- U.S. National Historic Landmark
- Clovis point in situ near a bison mandible and mammoth bone at the Lehner site, 1955. Higher-resolution photo linked at source.

- Location within Arizona Location within the United States
- Nearest city: Hereford, Arizona
- Coordinates: 31°26′N 110°6′W
- NRHP reference No.: 67000002

Significant dates
- Added to NRHP: May 28, 1967
- Designated NHL: May 28, 1967

The Lehner Mammoth-Kill Site is in southern Arizona (Cochise County) on the west bank of the San Pedro River 1.5 miles southwest of the town of Hereford. It is significant for its association with evidence that mammoths were killed here by Paleo-Indians 11,000 to 12,000 years before present.

The Lehner Mammoth-Kill Site was declared a National Historic Landmark in 1967. In 1988, Mr. and Mrs. Lehner donated the site to the Bureau of Land Management for the benefit and education of the public.

== Archaeology ==
In 1952, Ed Lehner discovered extinct mammoth bone fragments on his ranch, at the locality now known as the Lehner Mammoth-Kill Site. He notified the Arizona State Museum, and a summer of heavy rains in 1955 exposed more bones. Excavations, led by William W. Wasley and Emil Haury, took place in 1955–56, and again in 1974–75. In the initial effort, thirteen fluted projectile points, with 2 damaged, and 8 stone tools were found as well as 9 mammoth remains, one bison, a horse, and a tapir. The Clovis points were of chert, clear quartz, and chalcedony. Two hearths were discovered and sampled for radiocarbon dating. During the 1975 excavation the remains of a juvenile American Mastodon were found.

Bones of a variety of game—twelve immature mammoths, one horse, one tapir, several bison, one camel, one bear, several rabbits, and a garter snake—were excavated at the Lehner site.

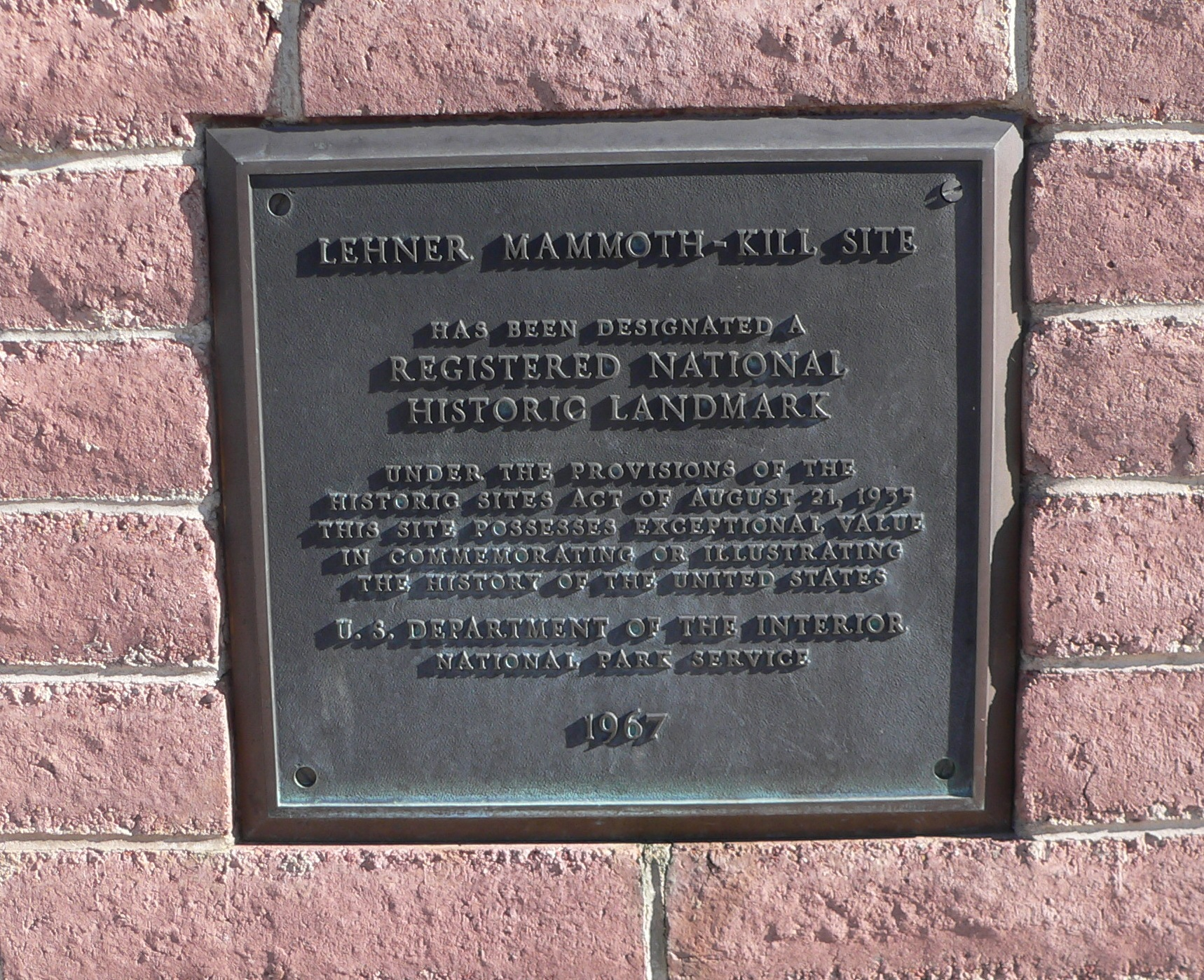
Lehner mammoth kill site plaque 2

The Lehner Mammoth kill and camp site exhibited a number of firsts: It was the first site associated with the Clovis culture to have definable fire hearths. These hearths provided the first radiocarbon dates for the culture (9,000 BCE). This site was also the first to have butchering tools in direct association with animal remains, and the first Clovis association with small animals, camel, and tapir. In addition to the obvious artifact remains, an inter-disciplinary group of scientists including archaeologists, botanists, geochronologists, geologists, paleontologists, palynologists, and zoologists have studied and interpreted a wide range of data from the site.

== See also ==
- Naco Mammoth Kill Site
