= San Pedro River (Arizona) =

River in northern Sonora, Mexico, and southern Arizona, USA

San Pedro River Rio San Pedro, Beaver River
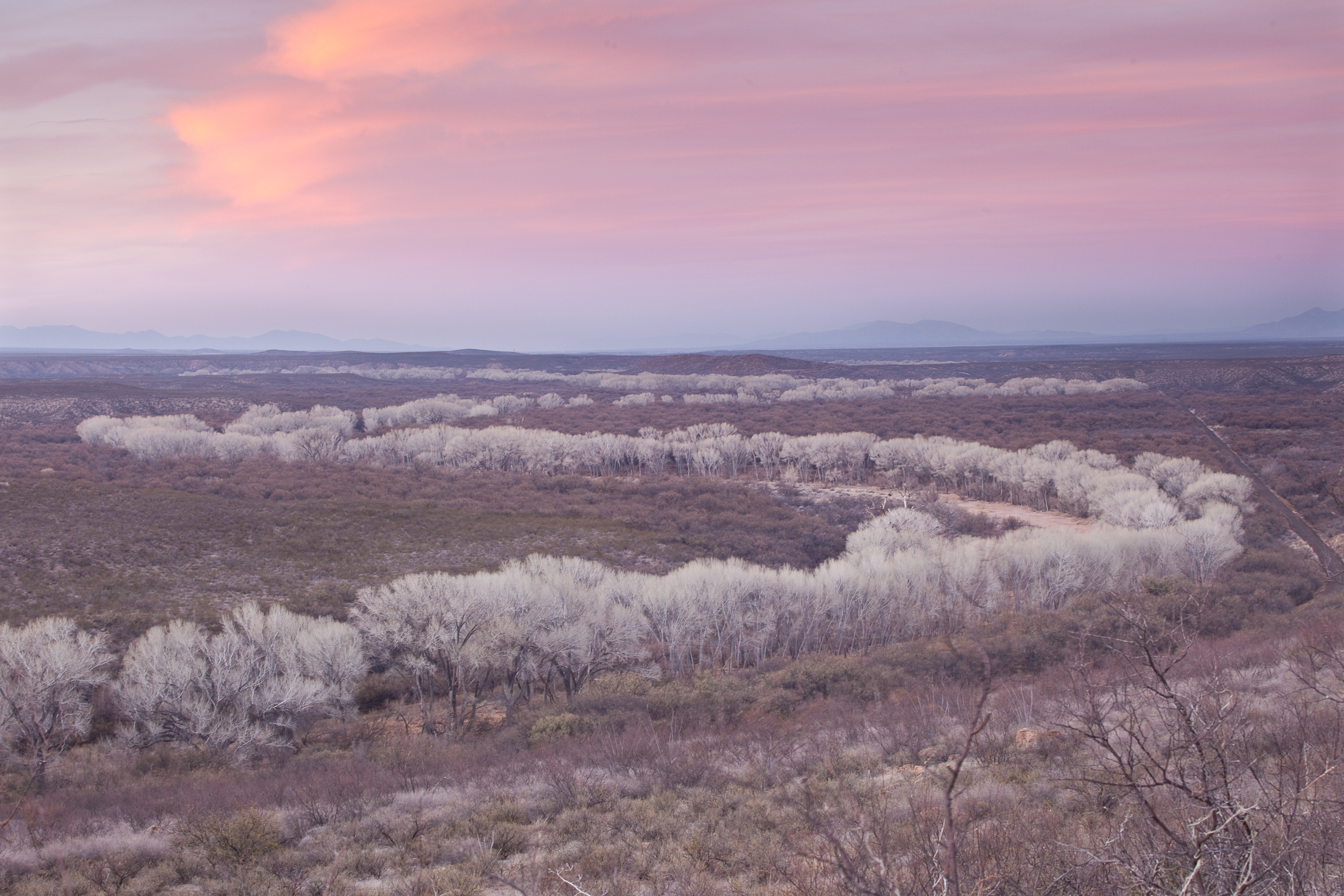
- San Pedro Riparian National Conservation Area; January 2010

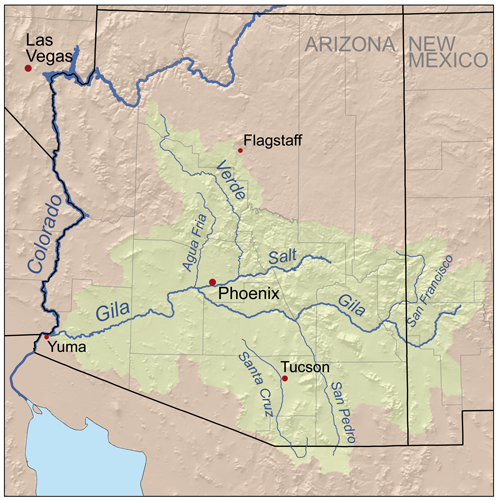
- Map of the Gila River watershed including the San Pedro River

Location
- Country: Mexico, United States
- State: Sonora, Arizona

Physical characteristics
- Source: The Sierra Manzanal Mountains in northern Sonora
  - location: North of Cananea, Mexico, Mexico
  - coordinates: 31°12′04″N 110°12′28″W
  - elevation: 4,460 ft (1,360 m)
- Mouth: Confluence with the Gila River
  - location: Winkelman, Arizona, Pinal County, United States
  - coordinates: 32°59′04″N 110°47′01″W
  - elevation: 1,919 ft (585 m)

Basin features
- Tributaries
  - left: Babocomari River
  - right: Aravaipa Creek

The San Pedro River is a northward-flowing stream originating about 10 miles (16 km) south of the international border south of Sierra Vista, Arizona, in Cananea Municipality, Sonora, Mexico. The river starts at the confluence of other streams (Las Nutrias and El Sauz) just east of Sauceda, Cananea. Within Arizona, the river flows 140 miles (230 km) north through Cochise County, Pima County, Graham County, and Pinal County to its confluence with the Gila River, at Winkelman, Arizona. It is the last major undammed desert river in the American Southwest, and it is of major ecological importance as it hosts two-thirds of the avian diversity in the United States, including 100 species of breeding birds and almost 300 species of migrating birds.

== History ==
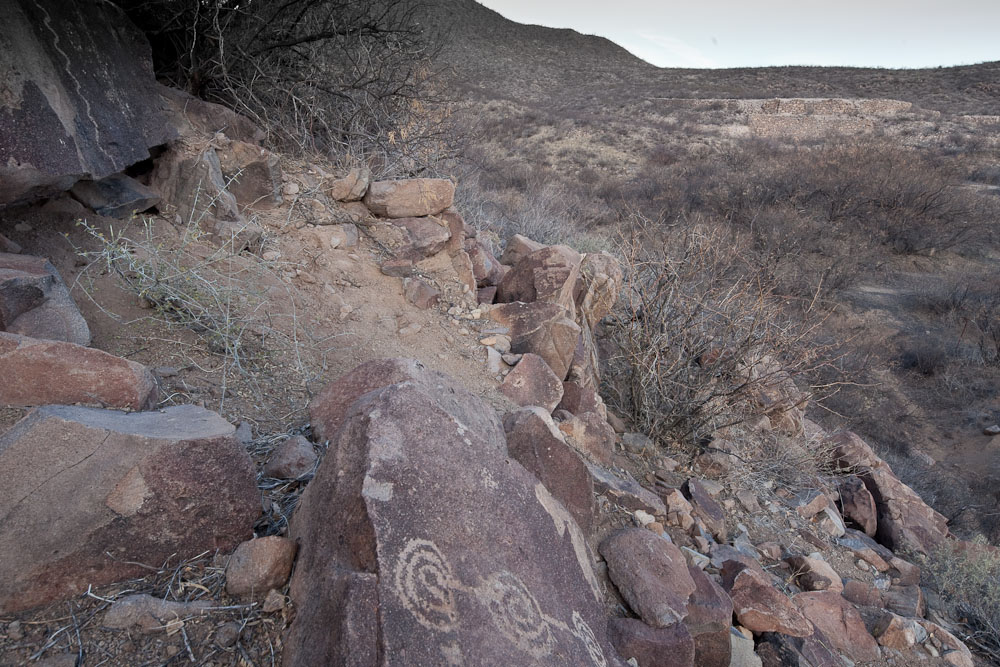
Pictographs near the San Pedro River

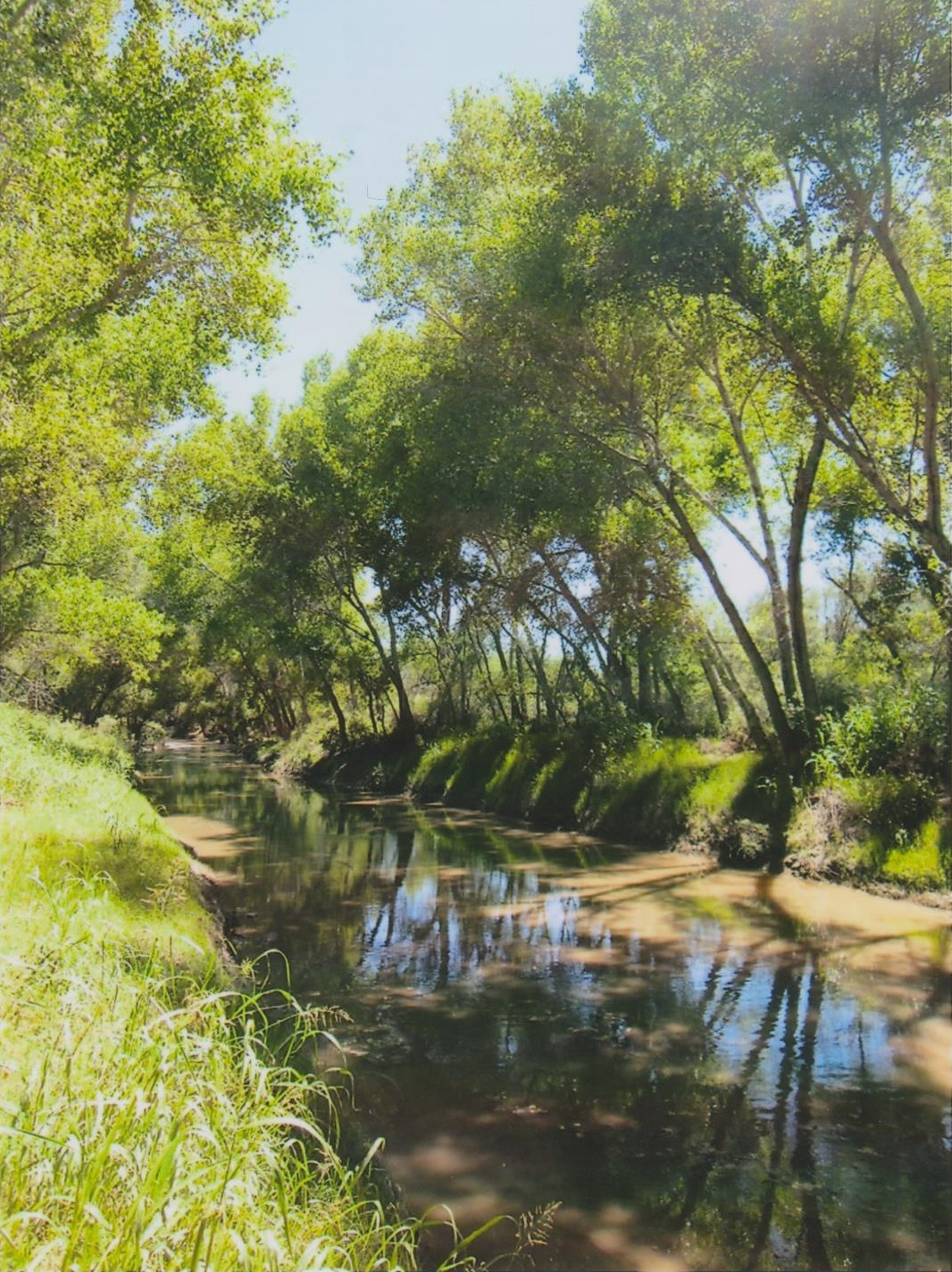
The San Pedro River near Palominas, Arizona.

The first people to enter the San Pedro Valley were the Clovis people who hunted mammoth here from 10,000 years ago. The San Pedro Valley has the highest concentration of Clovis sites in North America. Some Clovis sites of note are the Lehner Mammoth-Kill Site, the Murray Springs Clovis Site and the Naco Mammoth-Kill Site.

The hunter-gatherer, Cochise culture next made this area home between about 5000 to 200 BC. Followed by the more advanced Mogollon, Hohokam and Salado cultures who built permanent homes and engaged in agriculture here. By the time the first Europeans arrived these cultures had disappeared and the San Pedro River was home to the Sobaipuri people.

The first Europeans to visit the San Pedro River may have been the parties of Cabeza de Vaca, Fray Marcos de Niza or the Coronado expedition, and while no archeological evidence as yet exists of the passing of these groups, it has been fairly firmly established that the upper San Pedro was a widely recognized and utilized leg of the "Cibola Trail." The Jesuit priest Eusebio Kino visited the villages along the San Pedro and Babocomari Rivers in 1692 and soon after introduced the first livestock to this area (assuming Coronado's livestock did not survive/breed).

It is widely believed that by 1762 Apache depredation drove the Sobaipuri and Spanish out of the San Pedro Valley which then remained largely uninhabited until the early 1800s. This, however, is not true as a recent study has shown. Documents state that not all the Sobaipuri left and in the 1780s Sobaipuri were noted still living along the river. Archaeology has confirmed additional Sobaipuri settlements along the middle San Pedro not mentioned in the documentary record throughout the 1800s.

Early American exploration of the San Pedro River, like most rivers in western North America, was driven by the pursuit of beaver pelts. James Ohio Pattie and his father led a party of fur trappers down the Gila River and then down the San Pedro River in 1826 which was so successful that he called the San Pedro the Beaver River. The party was attacked by Apache Indians (probably the Aravaipa Band) at "Battle Hill" (probably Modern-day Malpais Hill) where they subsequently stashed and lost over 200 beaver pelts.

The Mormon Battalion marched through the river valley in 1846, and the only battle the battalion fought in their journey to California occurred near the river. The battalion's presence had aroused curiosity among a number of wild cattle, and the bulls of these herds damaged wagons and injured mules. In response, the men shot dozens of the charging bulls. Mormon settlers later returned to this area in 1877 to found a settlement that became St. David, and logged the Huachuca Mountains to provide lumber for building Fort Huachuca and Tombstone.

In the 19th century the river was a meandering stream with fluvial marshlands, riparian forest, Sporobolus grasslands and extensive beaver ponds. As the region experienced a rapid climate warming and drying, (coincident with beaver removal and large-scale cattle introduction; correlation not directly established) the river down-cut and then widened in a process of arroyo formation observed on many rivers in the Southwest. In 1895, J. A. Allen described a mammal collection from southeastern Arizona, "On the headwaters of the San Pedro, in Sonora, a colony of a dozen or more had their lodges up to 1893, when a trapper nearly exterminated them. All the streams in the White Mountains have beaver dams in them, although most of the animals have been trapped." The beaver were finally extirpated by 1920s dynamiting of the beaver dams from soldiers from Fort Huachuca to prevent malaria. By the mid-20th century the once perennial river only flowed during the rainy season and beaver, fluvial marshlands and Sporobolus grasslands were uncommon. Physician naturalist Edgar Alexander Mearns' 1907 Mammals of the Mexican boundary of the United States reported beaver (Castor canadensis) on the San Pedro River and the Babocomari River. Mearns claimed that the San Pedro River beaver represented a new subspecies Castor canadensis frondator or "Sonora beaver" that ranged from Mexico up to Wyoming and Montana.

== Ecology ==
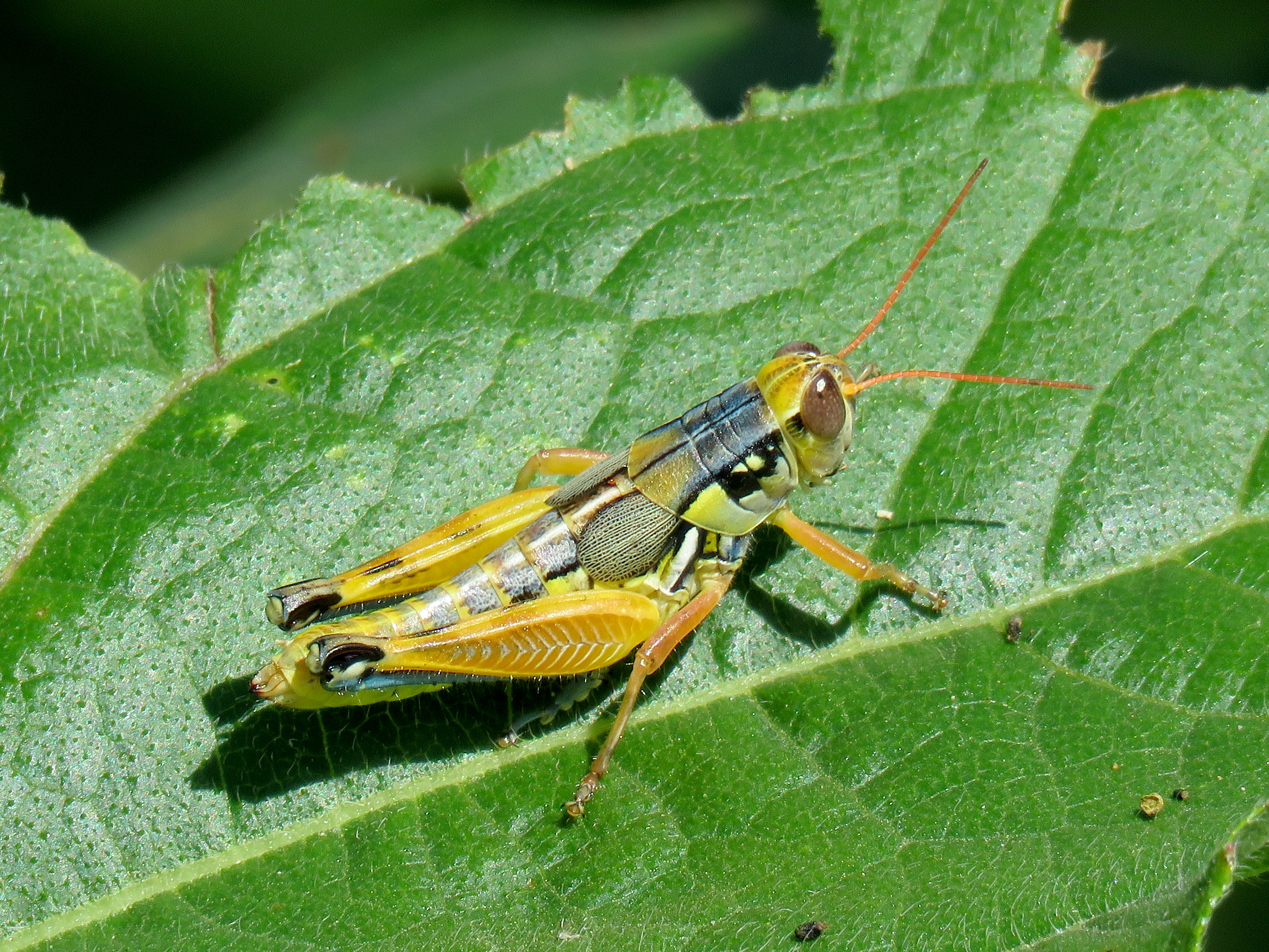
Arid Lands Spur-Throat Grasshopper (Melanoplus aridus)

The San Pedro River is the central corridor of the Madrean Archipelago of "Sky Islands", high mountains with unique ecosystems different from the ecology of the Sonoran desert "seas" that surround it.

More than 300 species of birds nest in by the river or use this corridor as they migrate between South, Central and North America. This includes the yellow-billed cuckoo (Coccyzus americanus). The area provides for more than 80 species of mammals, including jaguar (Panthera onca), coatimundi (Nasua narica), beaver (Castor canadensis frontador), 20 species of bats and several types of rodents. There are also over 65 species of reptiles and amphibians, among them Sonoran tiger salamander (Ambystoma mavortium stebbinsi) and western barking frog (Eleutherodactylus augusti). Some notable fish species native to the river are the endangered Gila chub (Gila intermedia), both the longfin and speckled dace, Sonora sucker and desert sucker, and the roundtail chub. The flora includes Fremont cottonwood (Populus fremontii), Goodding willow (Salix gooddingii), velvet mesquite trees, and the Huachuca water umbel (Lilaeopsis schaffneriana spp. recurva), Federally listed as endangered.

In recent decades, rapid growth and population increases in southern Arizona has caused concern with this river. Several non-profit organizations have risen in recent years to raise awareness of this problem. The San Pedro Riparian National Conservation Area (SPRNCA) was established in 1988 to protect some forty miles of the upper San Pedro valley. The Nature Conservancy also owns several preserves in the watershed, including the San Pedro River Preserve, Aravaipa Canyon Preserve, Muleshoe Ranch Preserve, Ramsey Canyon Preserve, and most recently, Rancho Los Fresnos. Rancho Los Fresnos, near the river's source, is the largest ciénega, an isolated desert spring or marsh, remaining in the San Pedro River watershed. Its protection is important as 99% of the ciénegas in the Southwest have been drained and destroyed.

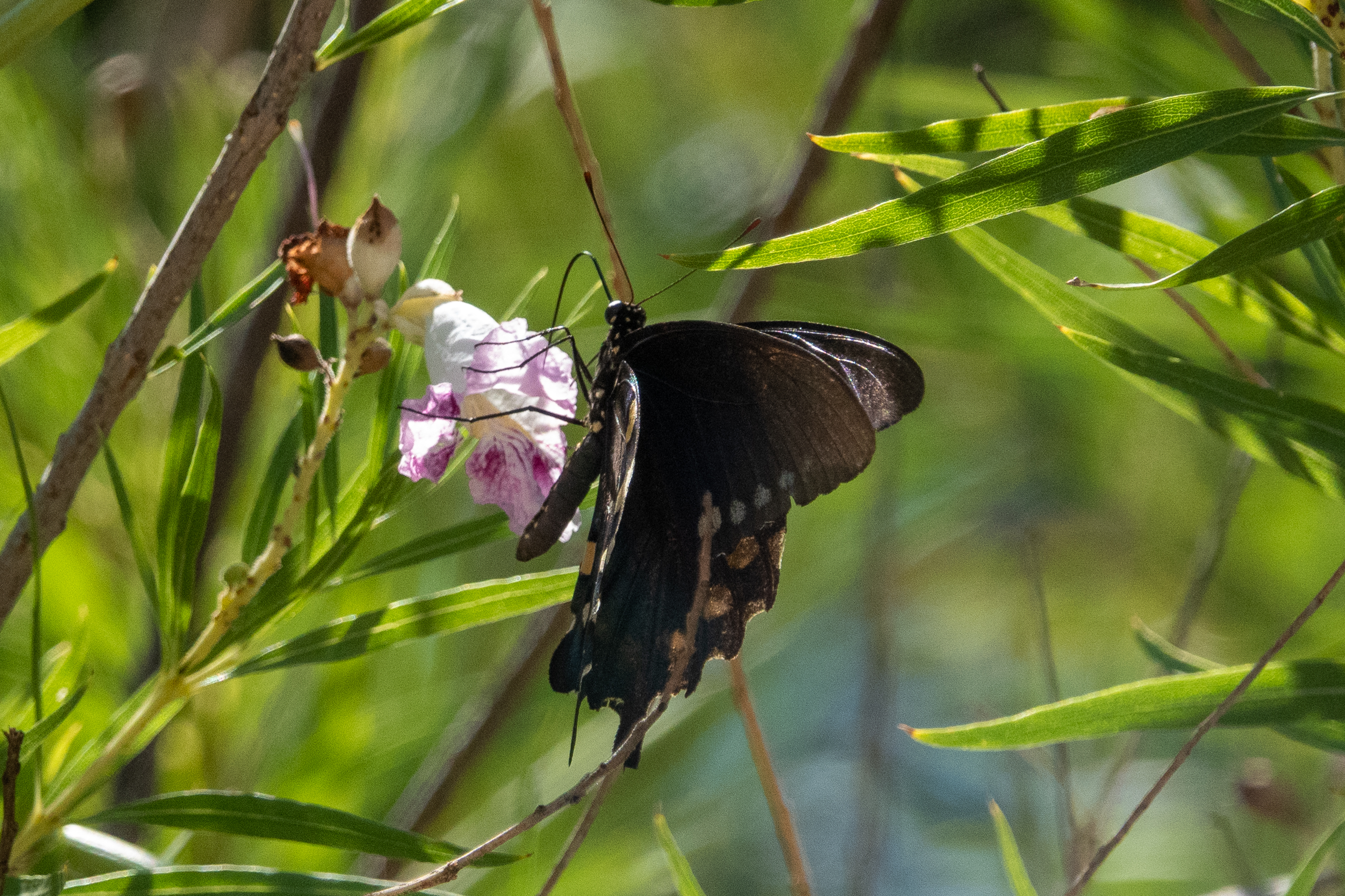
Pipevine Swallowtail Butterfly (Battus philenor)

With large portions of the river dry much of the year, Bureau of Land Management (BLM) wildlife biologist Mark Fredlake proposed restoring beaver to the watershed to retain water flows into the dry season and to support re-growth of the historic riparian vegetation. Riparian habitat covers only 1% of the Southwest but supports 50% of breeding bird species and is vital as a food source for migrating avifauna. Fredlake reasoned that beaver dams would raise the water table, allowing groundwater to recharge the river's flow in the dry season. From 1999 to 2002, 19 beavers were released into the SPRNCA, a 40-mile (64 km) stretch of the river, in Cochise County. By 2006 there were more than 30 dams. The beavers also dispersed widely and rapidly. One beaver migrated to Aravaipa Canyon, more than 100 rivermiles away; another to the river's terminus at the Gila River, earning itself the moniker “the surfing beaver”; and others up into Mexico, building several dams along the river's upper tributaries. The program was successful with measurable increases in bird diversity and formation of deep pools and lasting flows. In 2008, flooding destroyed all the beaver dams and this was followed by a long drought. However, as in historic times the beaver seems well adapted to the San Pedro River, and the 2009 dam count is back above 30 with a current population between 30 and 120 beavers. A short video reviews the use of re-introduced beaver to restore the river. In the upper river, re-introduced beavers have created willow and pool habitat which has extended the range of the endangered Southwestern willow flycatcher (Empidonax trailii extimus) with the southernmost verifiable nest recorded there in 2005.

== Watershed ==
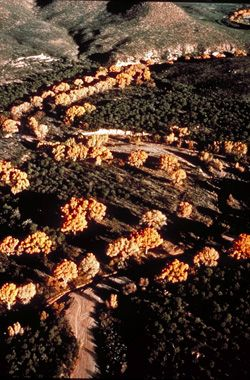
San Pedro RCNA in the Fall

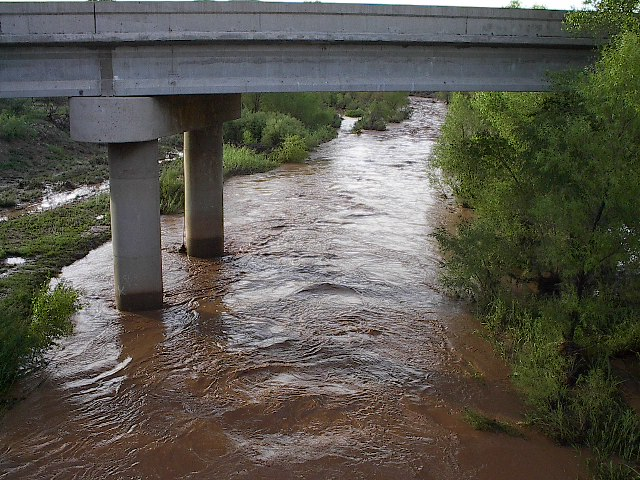
A typical river flow following the monsoon rains. This photo was taken on August 16, 2005, at the Charleston Road bridge, several miles west of Tombstone, Arizona. Estimated depth at this location is 5 feet.

The San Pedro drains an area of approximately 4,720 square miles (12,200 km^{2}) in Cochise, Graham, Pima, and Pinal Counties. Its course traverses deep sedimentary basins flanked by the Huachuca, Mule, Whetstone, Dragoon, Rincon, Little Rincon, Winchester, Galiuro, Tortilla, and Santa Catalina Mountains. The San Pedro is fed by numerous tributaries, which in general, drain relatively short and steep catchments oriented more or less perpendicular to the mainstem. For most of its length the San Pedro flows over sedimentary basin fill deposits, although it is bound by bedrock at the Tombstone Hills at Charleston and near Fairbank, “the Narrows” south of Cascabel, near Redington, and again at Dudleyville (Heindl, 1952). Two major tributaries, Babocomari River and Aravaipa Creek, each have extensive bedrock-lined stretches. Historically the San Pedro has been divided into upper and lower reaches at the Narrows.

On May 27, 2011, a U.S. District judge ruled that Fort Huachaca's plan to pump 6,100 acre-feet (7,500,000 m^{3}) of groundwater without mitigation plans to replenish the San Pedro River flows failed to protect the endangered Southwestern willow flycatcher (Empidonax traillii) and the Huachuca water umbel so they could recover from their imperiled status. The ruling was in response to a second lawsuit brought by the Center for Biological Diversity and the Maricopa Audubon Society. In 2002, in response to an earlier suit filed by the center, another judge tossed out an earlier Wildlife Service biological opinion that the water pumping could be mitigated.

The river's watershed is threatened by the Mexico–United States border wall, as Secretary of Homeland Security Michael Chertoff waived the Endangered Species Act of 1973, Clean Water Act, and National Environmental Policy Act, in order to build a wall.

== Geology, paleontology ==
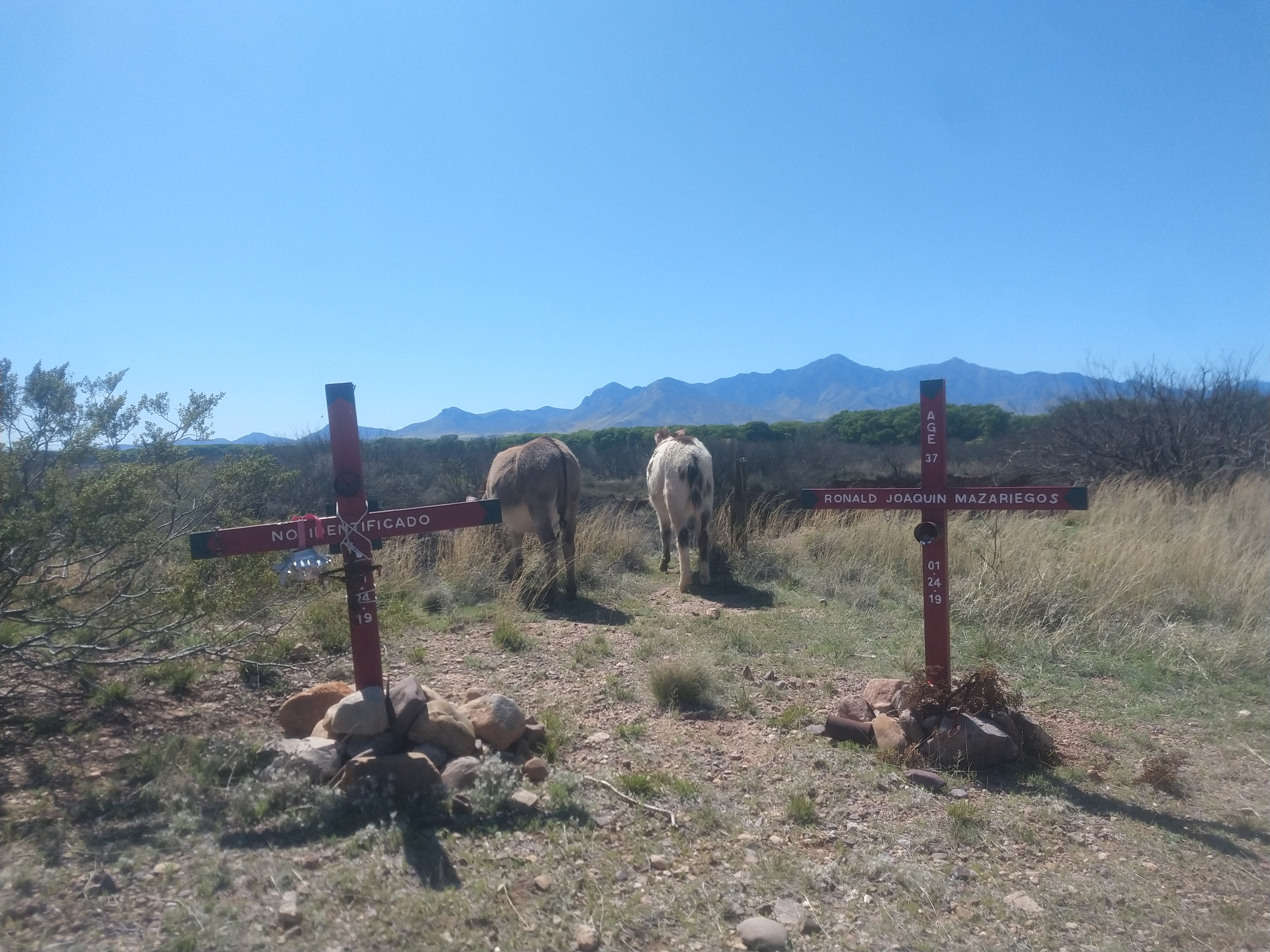
Sites marked where persons perished crossing la Frontera from Mexico, North up San Pedro River

The San Pedro Valley is a site for Holocene mammal fossils because of the riparian environment.

In recent decades, the Arizona Geological Society has focused on the region, as well as researchers. Development pressures, recreation, and groundwater harvesting have led to recent concerns of protecting the region. A recent floodplain study focused on the Holocene floodplain alluvium and its history, over a 125-mile (201 km) stretch of the river to understand subground waterflow resources.

== References In Film ==
- Kevin Costner's 2024 film Horizon: An American Saga – Chapter 1 places the fictional settlement of Horizon in the San Pedro River Valley. The future installments (Chapters 2, 3, and 4) are also planned for this location.

== Picture gallery ==
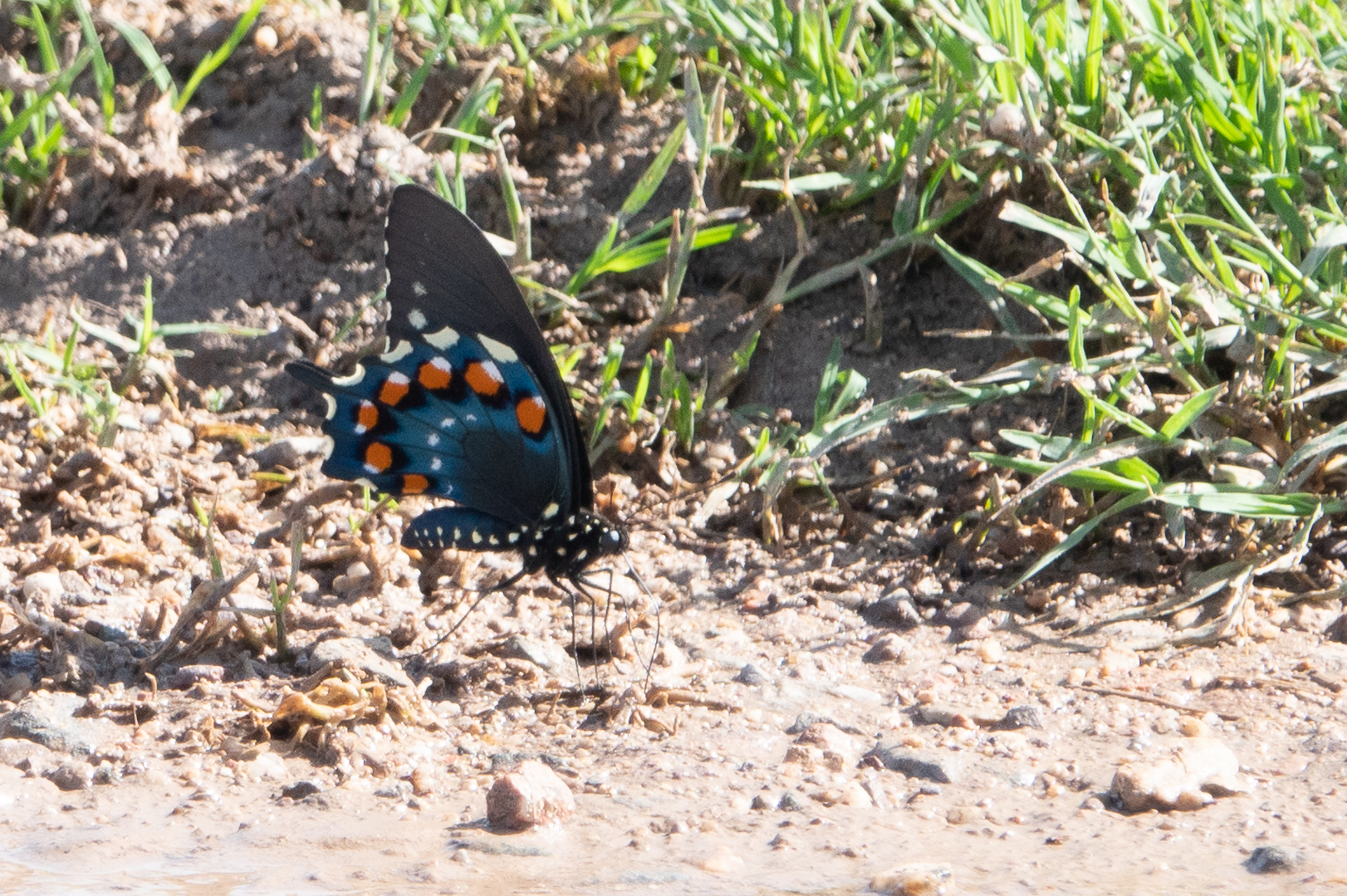
Pipevine Swallowtail Butterfly

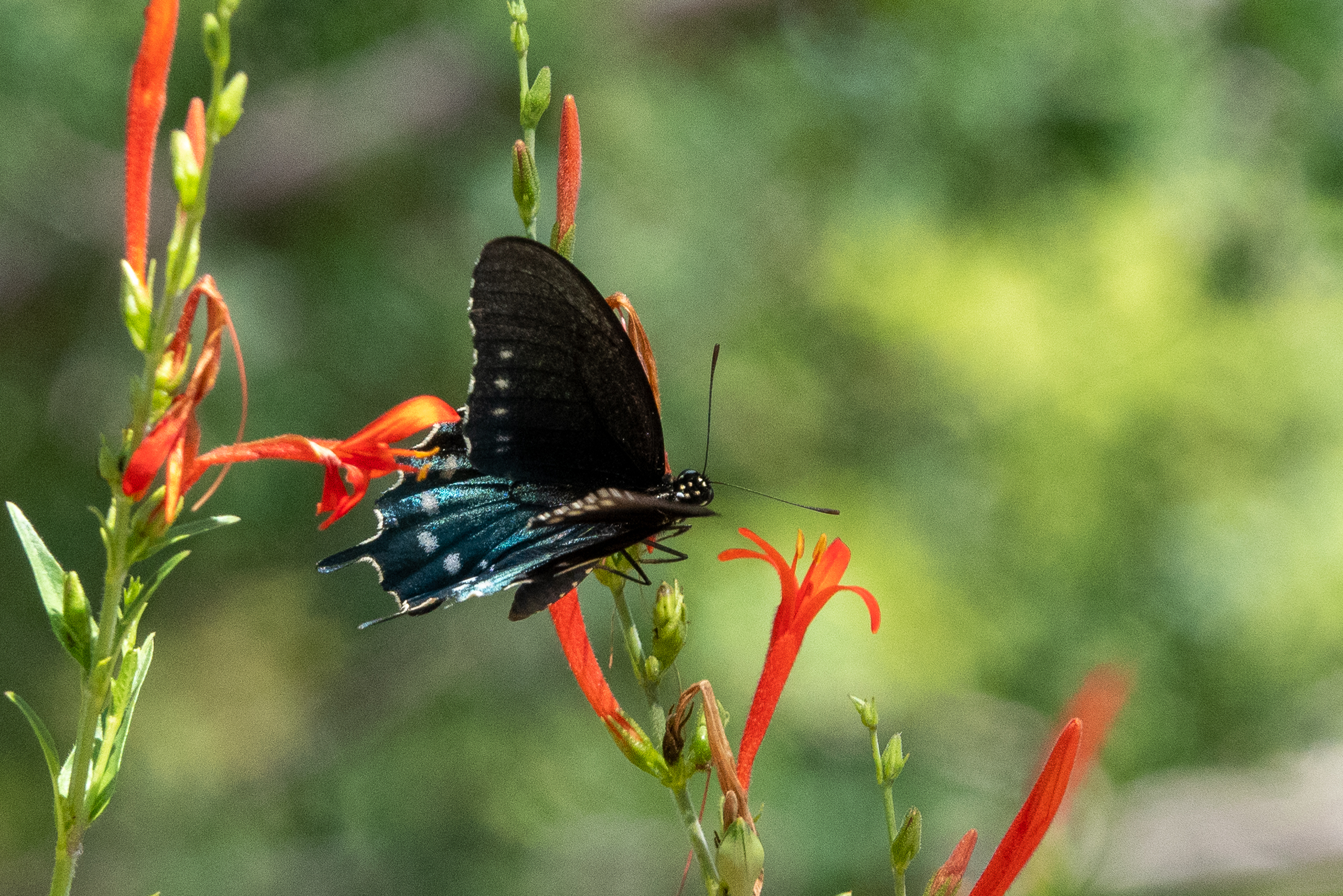
Pipevine Swallowtail Butterfly

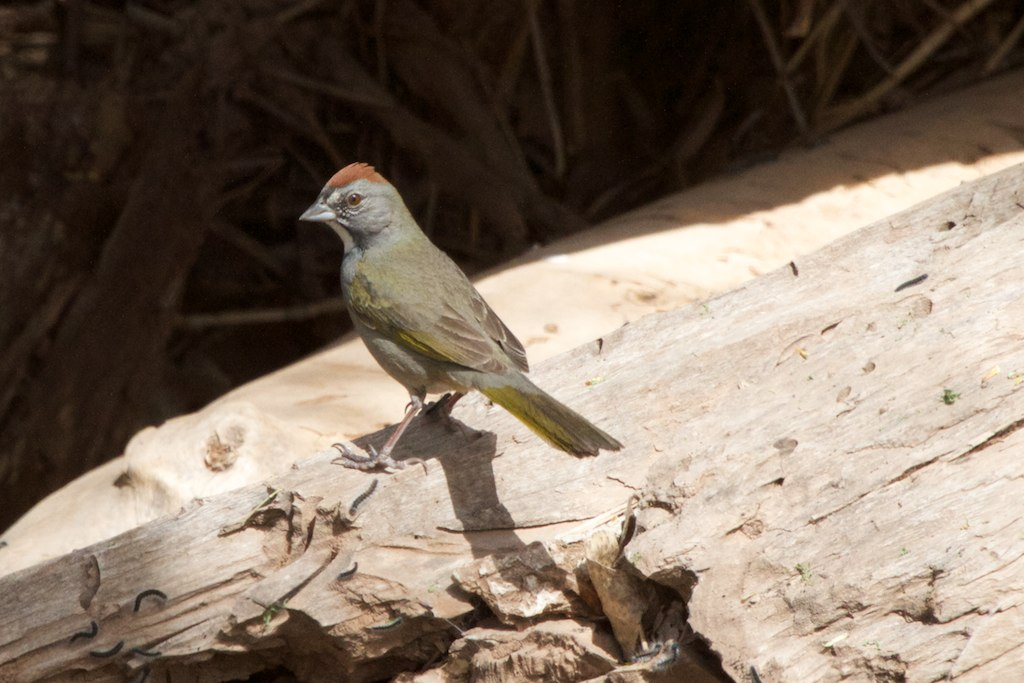
Green-tailed towhee (Pipilo chlorurus)

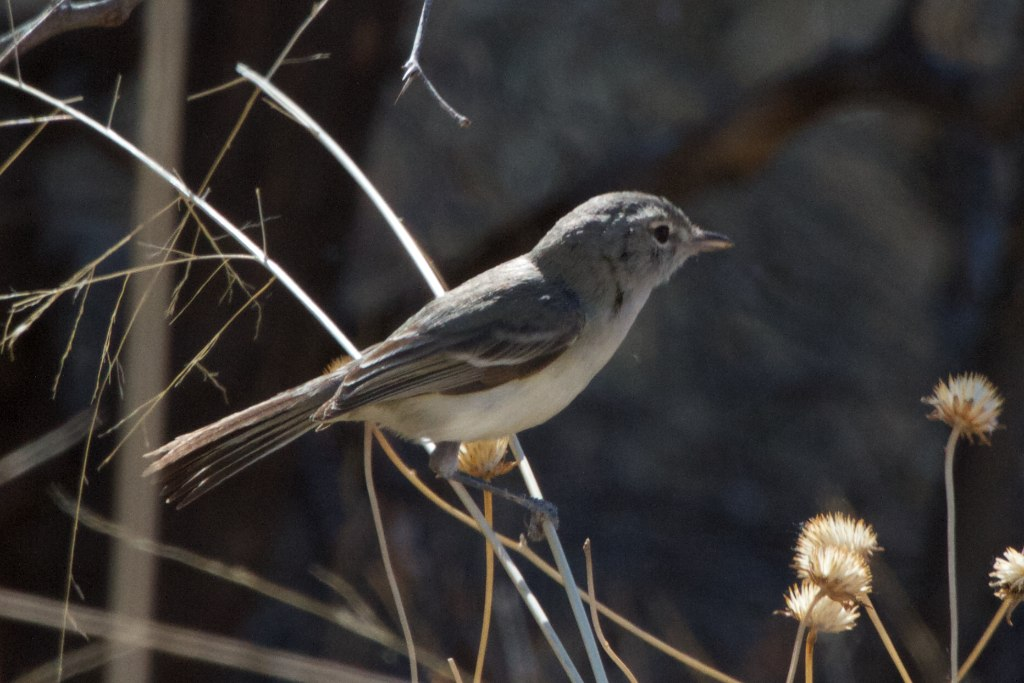
Bell's vireo(Vireo bellii)

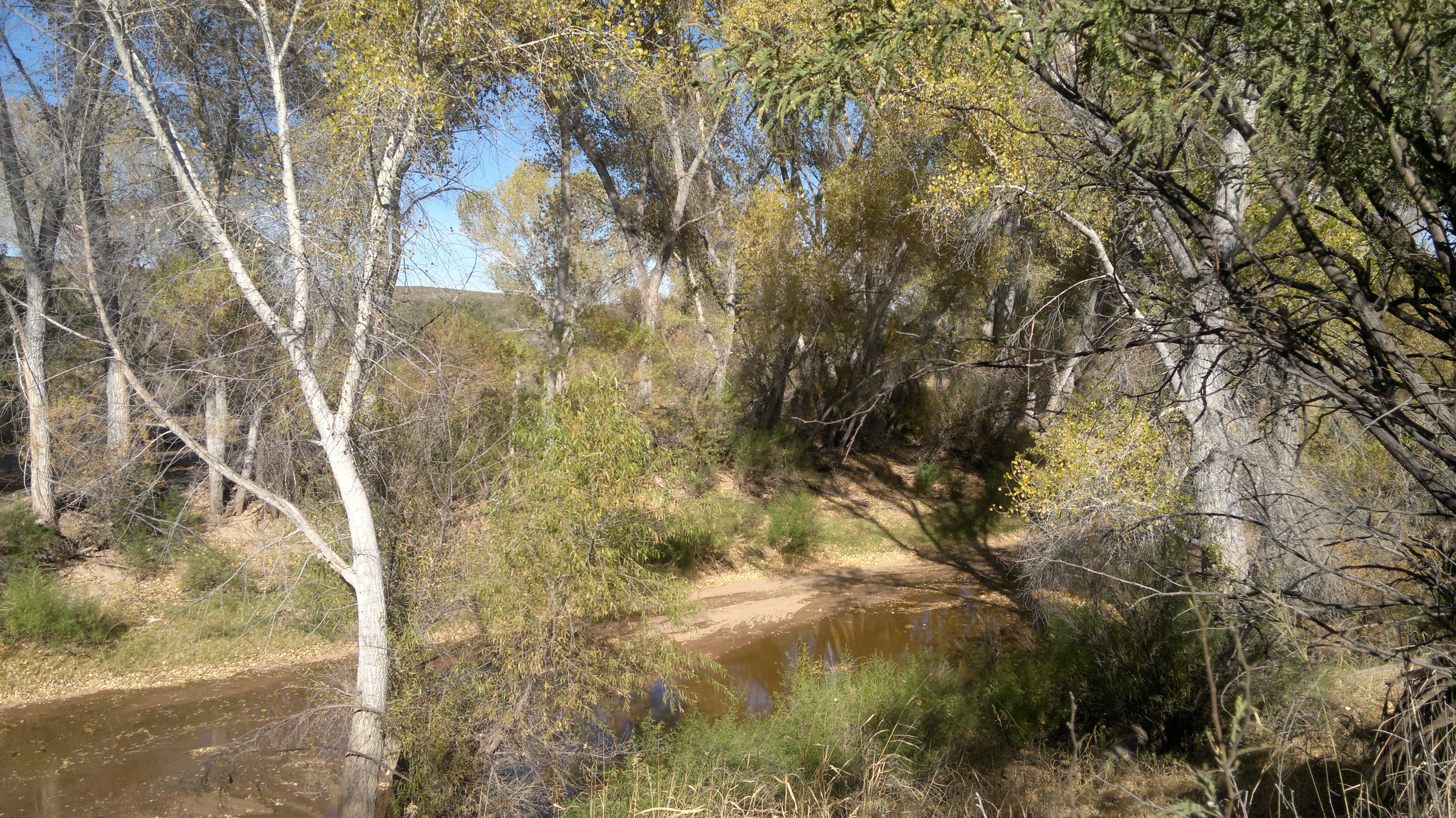

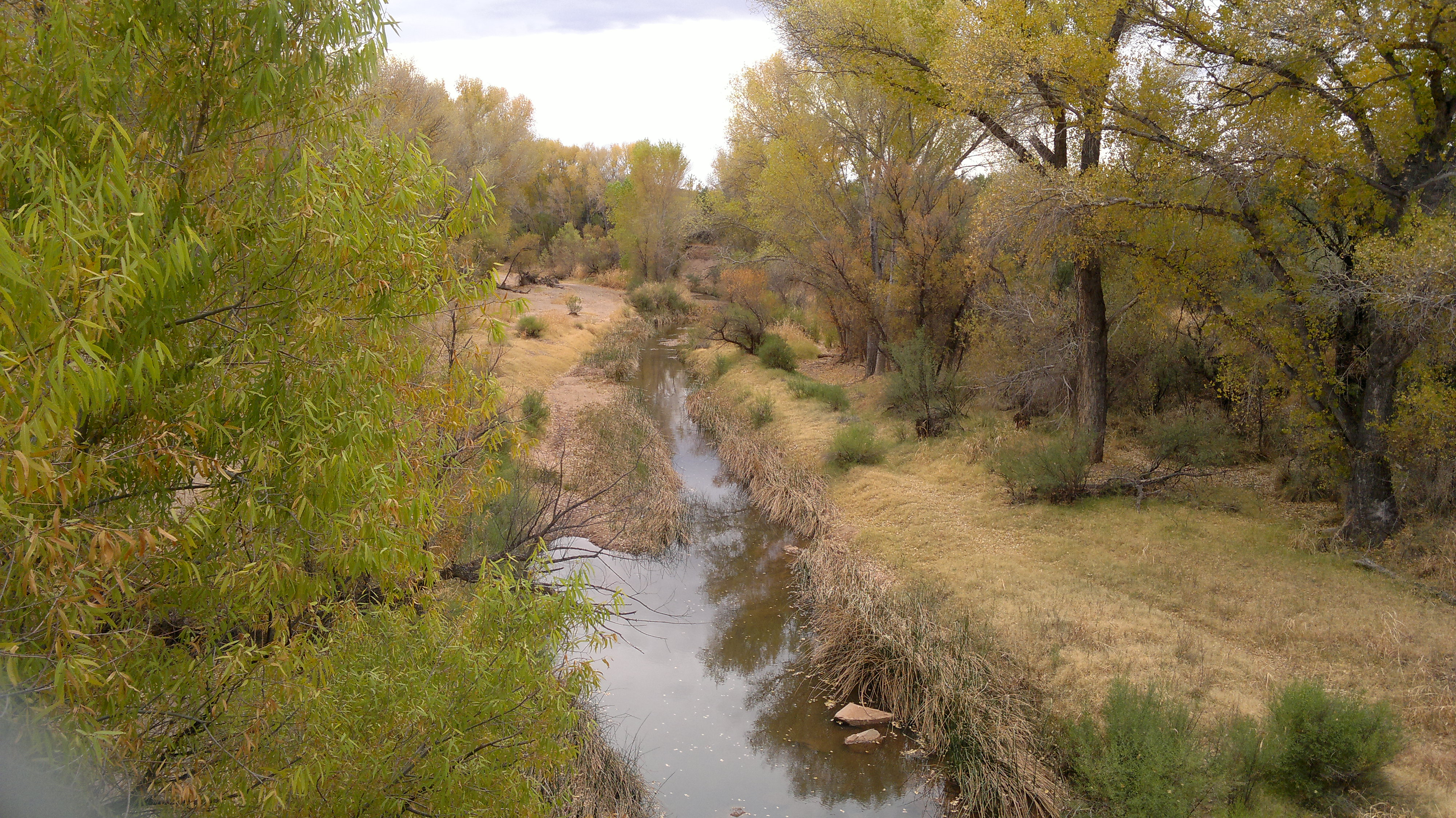

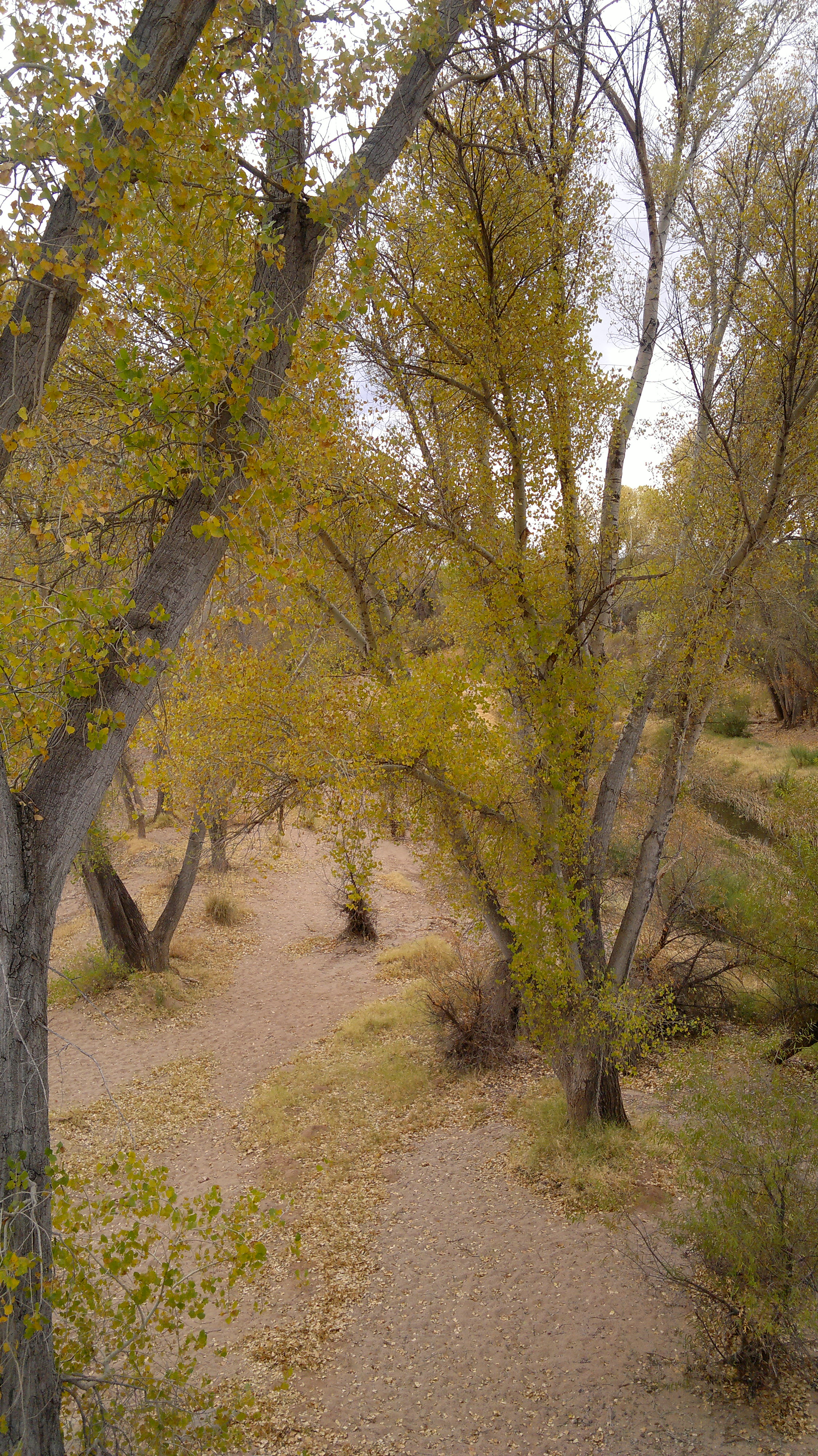

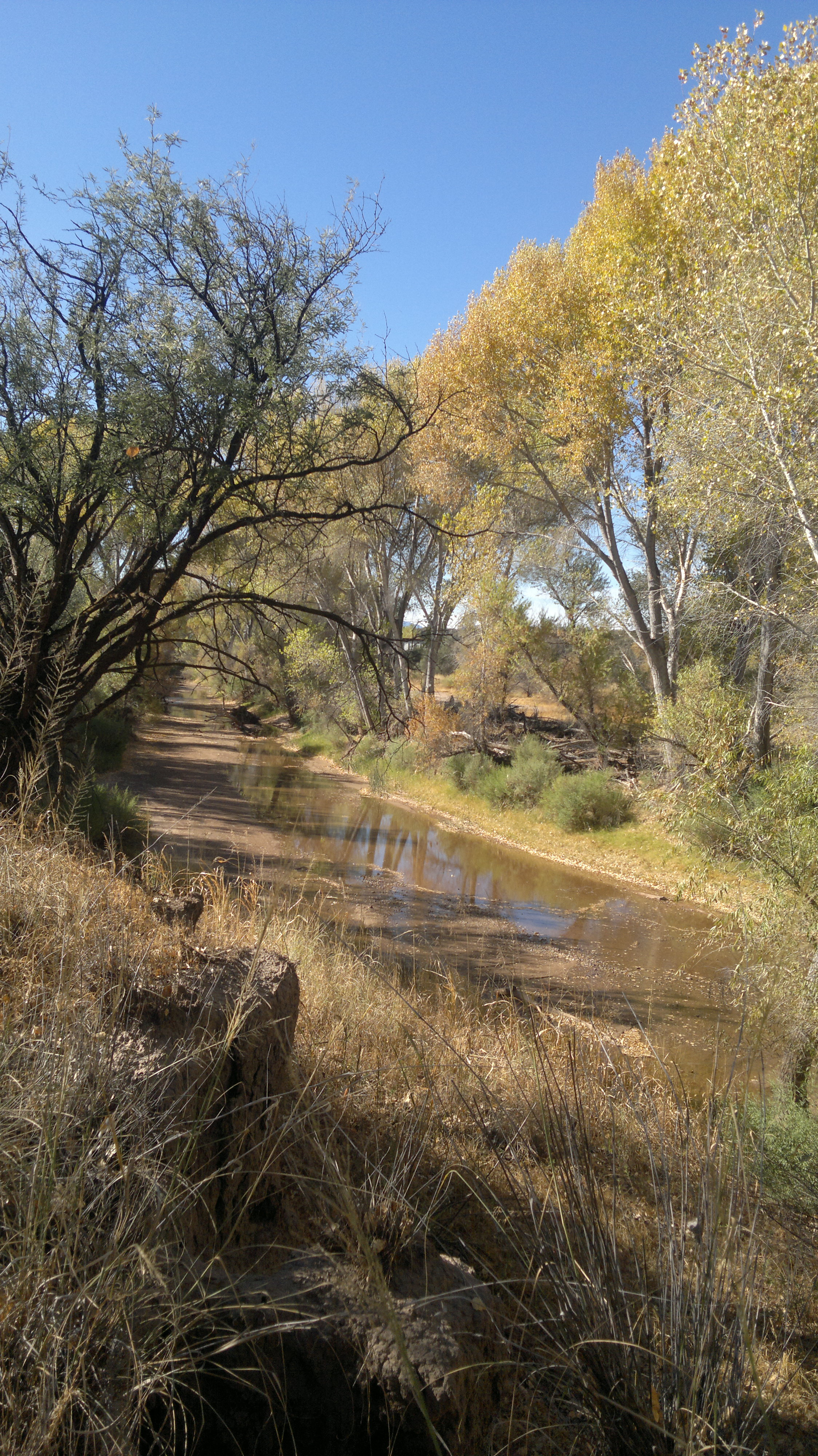

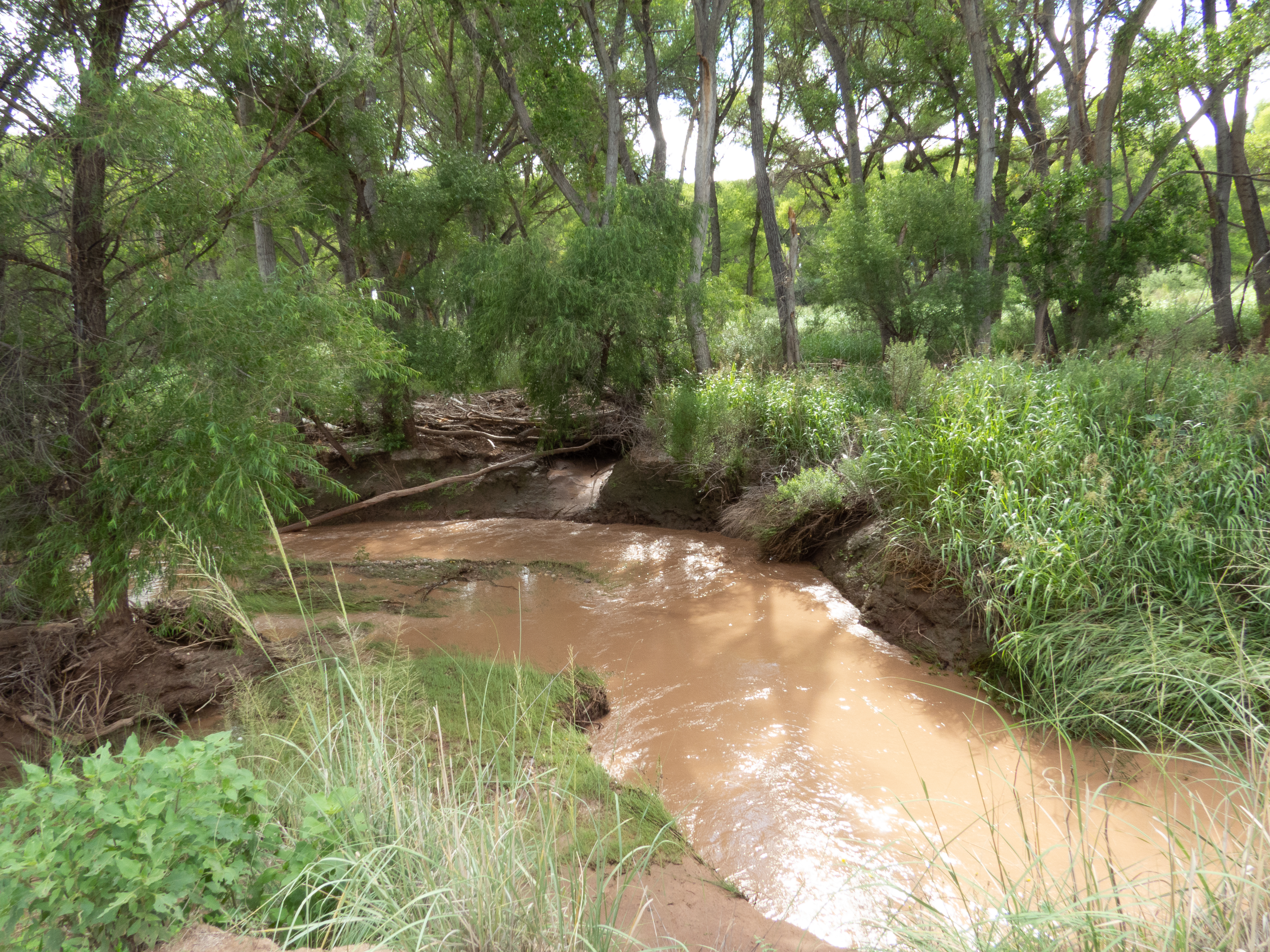

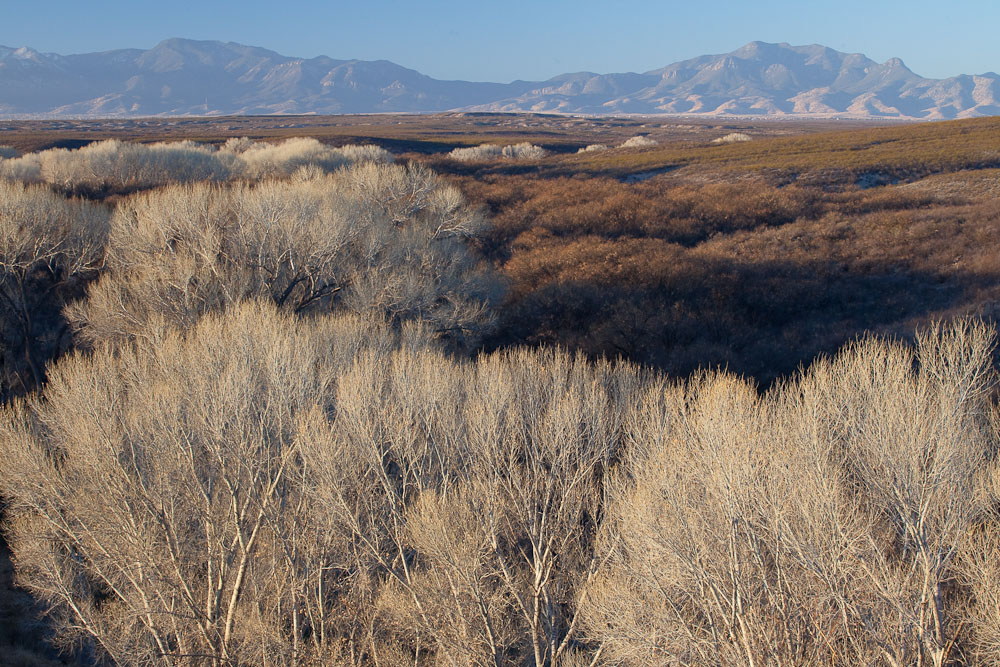

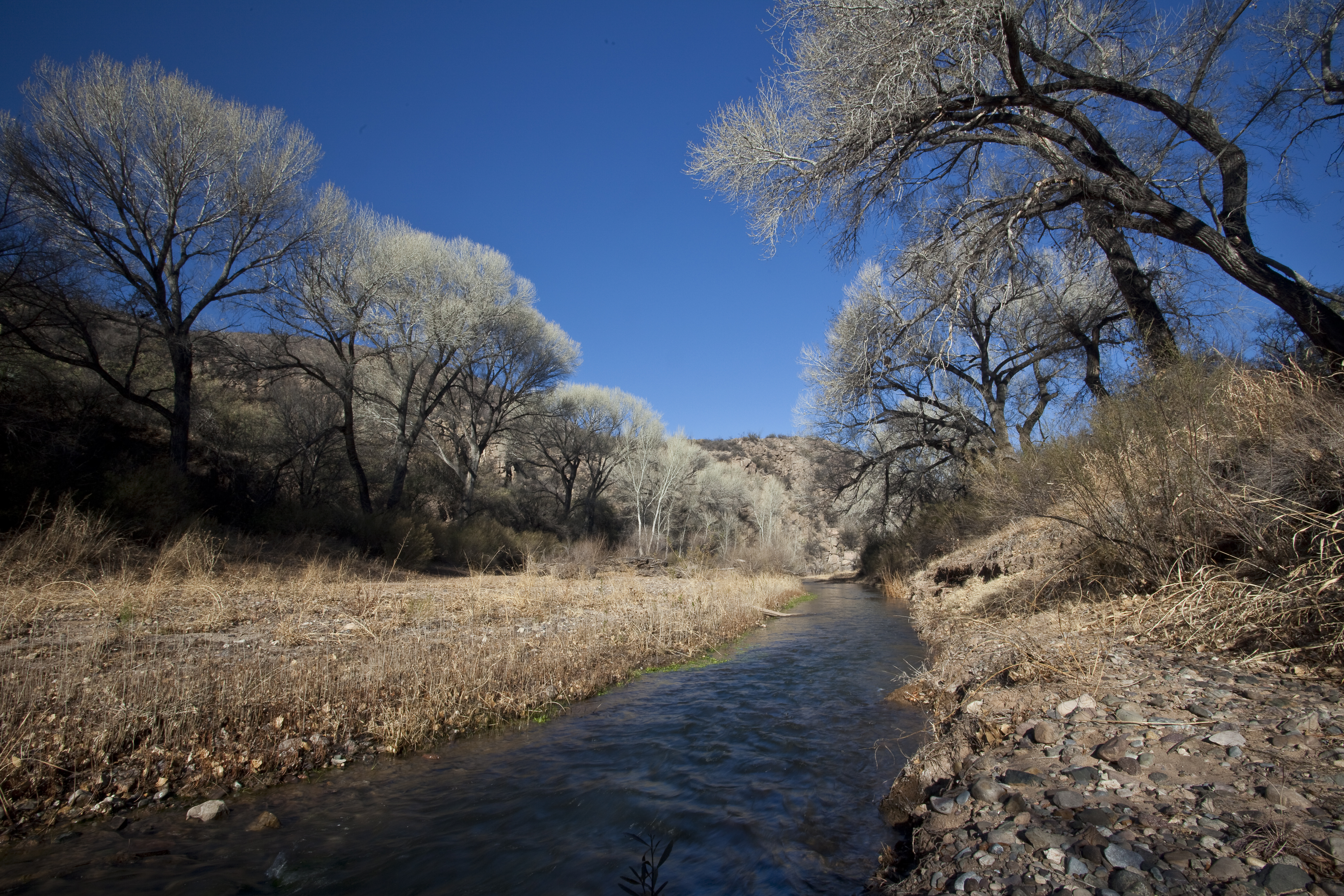

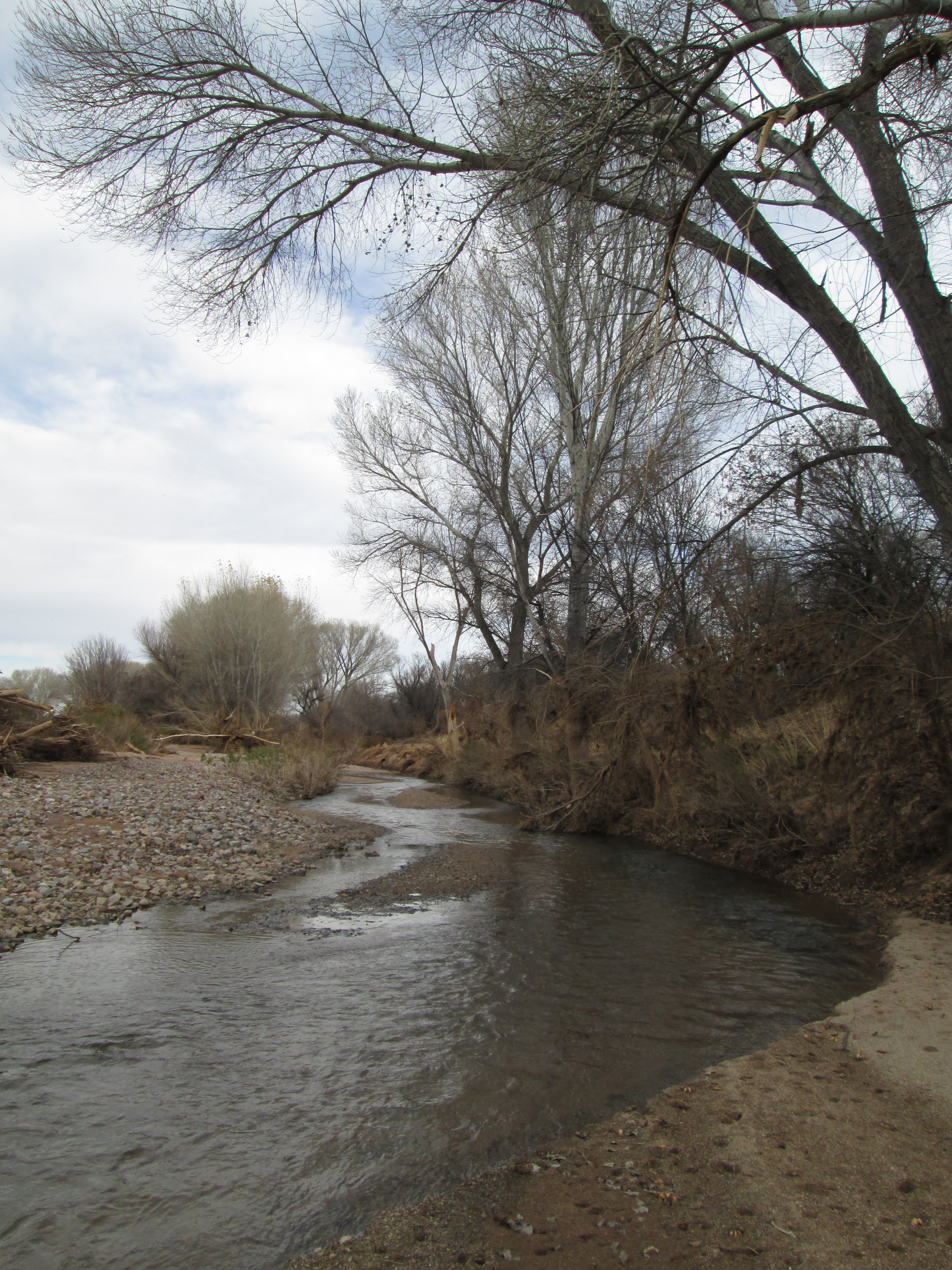

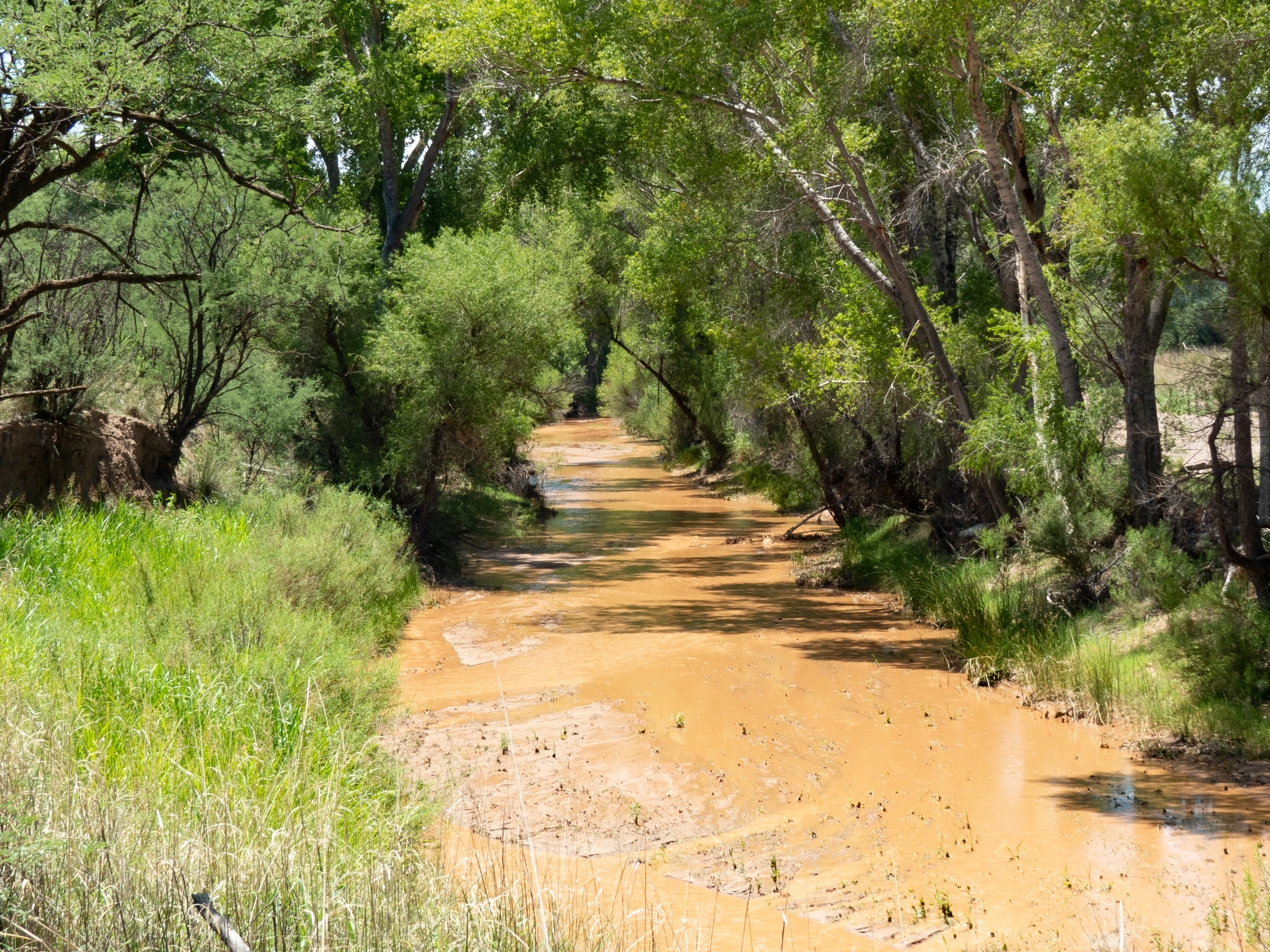

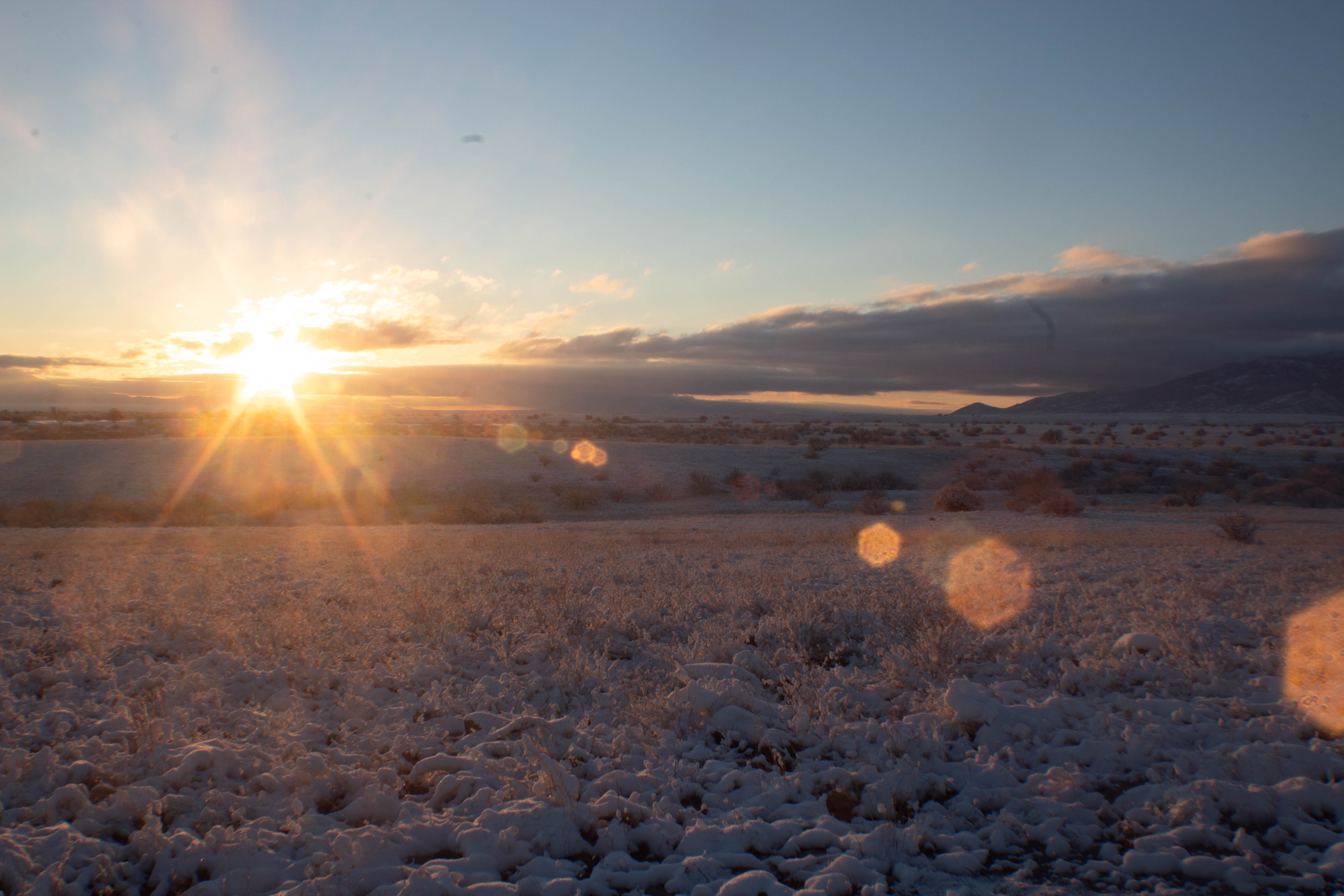

== See also ==
- San Pedro Riparian National Conservation Area
- List of Arizona rivers
- List of tributaries of the Colorado River
- From Desert to Sky Islands
