= List of historic properties in Willcox, Arizona =

- Town
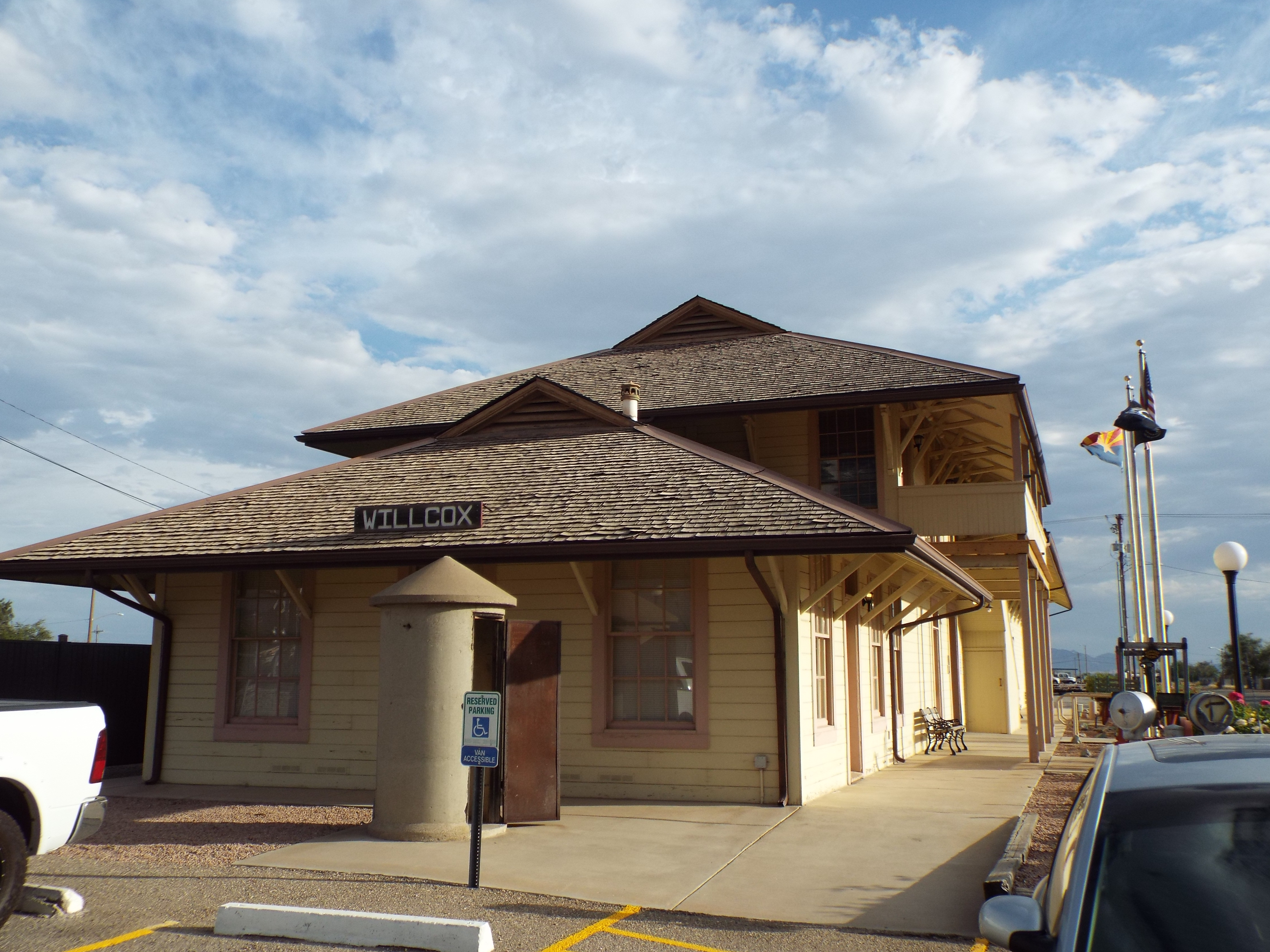
- Willcox Southern Pacific Railroad Depot

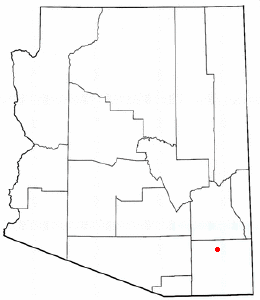
- Location of Willcox in Arizona
- Coordinates: 32°0′31″N 109°23′21″W

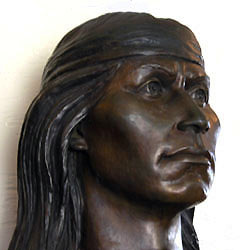
Sculpture of Cochise

This is a list, which includes a photographic gallery, of some of the remaining historic buildings, houses, structures and monuments in Willcox, Arizona, a town located in Cochise County. Some of the structures are located in the Railroad Avenue Historic District. Some of the structures are individually listed in the National Register of Historic Places (NRHP). There are others which are considered historical by the Sulphur Springs Valley Historical Society. Also included is the Chiricahua National Monument Historic Designed Landscape and images of the historic City Cemetery where Warren Earp. the younger brother of Wyatt Earp is buried.

== History ==
The Native-Americans inhabited the area where the town of Willcox and its surrounding areas are located before the arrival of the people of European ancestry from the East Coast of the United States. The principal Native-American tribe which inhabited southeastern Arizona were the Chiricahua Apaches. They called themselves the Chiricahua Apache (Apache: great mountain) after their former mountain home in southeast Arizona. Their own name true name is actually the Aiaha.

== Apache Wars ==
Compared to the other tribes in Arizona, the Chiricahua tribe were the most warlike. Among their leaders were Cochise, Victorio, Loco, Chato, Naiche, and Geronimo. The Chiricahua were involved in the so-called "Indian Wars" now referred to as the Apache Wars of the 1860s and 1870s. Some historians believe a misunderstanding during the "Bascom Affair" launched clashes with the Chiricahua.

Cochise was the Apache chief during the Apache Wars, he led an uprising against the U.S. government which began in 1861, and persisted until a peace treaty in 1872.

In 1872, President Ulysses S. Grant sent General Oliver Howard, as a special commissioner, to Arizona. Howard together with Tom Jeffords, a trusted friend of Cochise, met with the Chiricahua Chief. Their meeting concluded in an agreement to cease hostilities with the understanding that Cochise would use his influence with the other Chiricahua Apaches to this end. By the autumn of this year more than 1,000 of the tribe were settled on the newly established Chiricahua Reservation, southeast Arizona. Cochise died in 1874. Cochise County was named after the Chiricahua Apache Chief and the land where he is buried is now the Chiricahua National Monument. In 1878, General Orlando Bolivar Willcox assumed command of the Department of Arizona during the last years of the Apache Wars.

== Willcox is established ==
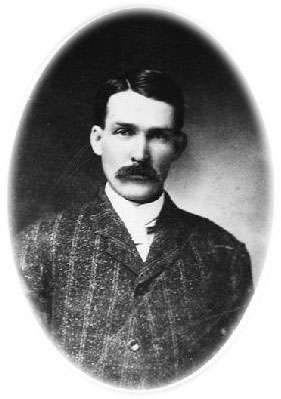
Warren Baxter Earp

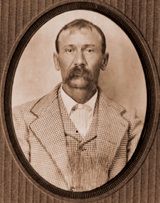
William "Bill" Downing

In 1880, the small town of "Maley" was founded as a whistlestop for the Southern Pacific Railroad. A whislestop is a train station where a train will stop only on request; that is, only if there are passengers or freight to be picked up or dropped off. The station was an important supply point for the Army during the Apache Wars from 1880 to 1886. It was also important to the cattle ranching and mining industries of southeastern Arizona as a major shipping point. General Willcox remained in his post until 1882. The citizens of the town of Maley renamed the town in his honor, however, his surname was misspelled and instead of being spelled with two "L"s it was spelled with one, hence "Wilcox". In 1889, the correction of the town's name was made and therefore "Wilcox" finally became "Willcox".

In the early years, Willcox was a town with many saloons and hotels. There were shootings practically every week in Willcox and its surrounding area. Two of the more notable shootings involved Warren Earp in 1900 and Bill Downing in 1908.

Warren Baxter Earp, the youngest of the Earp brothers, was ill-tempered. He wasn't in town during the OK Corral gunfight, but he did participate in Wyatt Earp's revenge where many cowboys were murdered. Earp lived in Willcox. He disliked a fellow ranch cowboy named Johnny Boyett. He habitually bullied Boyett for months past. Earp and Boyett ran into each other in the "Headquarters Saloon" and Earp challenged Boyett to fight to the death. Boyett got a gun from the Willcox Hotel, and charged after Earp. After missing a few times, Earp was mortally wounded.

Bill Downing was a member of the Burt Alvord gang. The gang was caught and arrested in Pearce after robbing the Cochise Train Depot. They were held in the prison of Tombstone. Members of the gang that were not arrested went to Tombstone and rescued the gang members in jail, but left Downing in jail because they disliked him.

After spending seven years in the Yuma prison, Downing went to Willcox and opened the Free and Easy Saloon. He hired prostitutes who picked pocketed the customers. The town Sheriff and his Deputy went to the bar to serve Downing a warrant for his arrest. Downing dashed out a back door, but found himself face to face with the Deputy who had a shotgun. Downing reached for his gun and the Deputy shot him dead. What Downing didn't know is that he didn't have his gun because one the prostitutes stole it before he went out. The town celebrated when they learned of his death.

Both Earp and Downing were buried in the historic "Old City Cemetery" of Willcox. The Pioneers' Cemetery Association (PCA) defines an "historic cemetery" as one which has been in existence for more than fifty years.

== Sulphur Springs Valley Historical Society ==
The mission of the Sulphur Springs Valley Historical Society is to collect, preserve and display historical artifacts and archives related to the cultural history of Willcox and its surrounding area in northern Cochise County, and the history of the Chiricahua Apache. The historic building known as "The Toggery", is an extension of the Chiricahua Regional Museum and contains the research library and museum archives. The citizens of Willcox have preserved many of the historic buildings.

A property may be listed in the National Register of Historic Places or it may be eligible to be listed as such, however, that does not mean that the property is safe from being demolished by its owner. According to Jim McPherson, Arizona Preservation Foundation Board President:

"It is crucial that residents, private interests, and government officials act now to save these elements of our cultural heritage before it is too late."

== Chiricahua National Monument ==
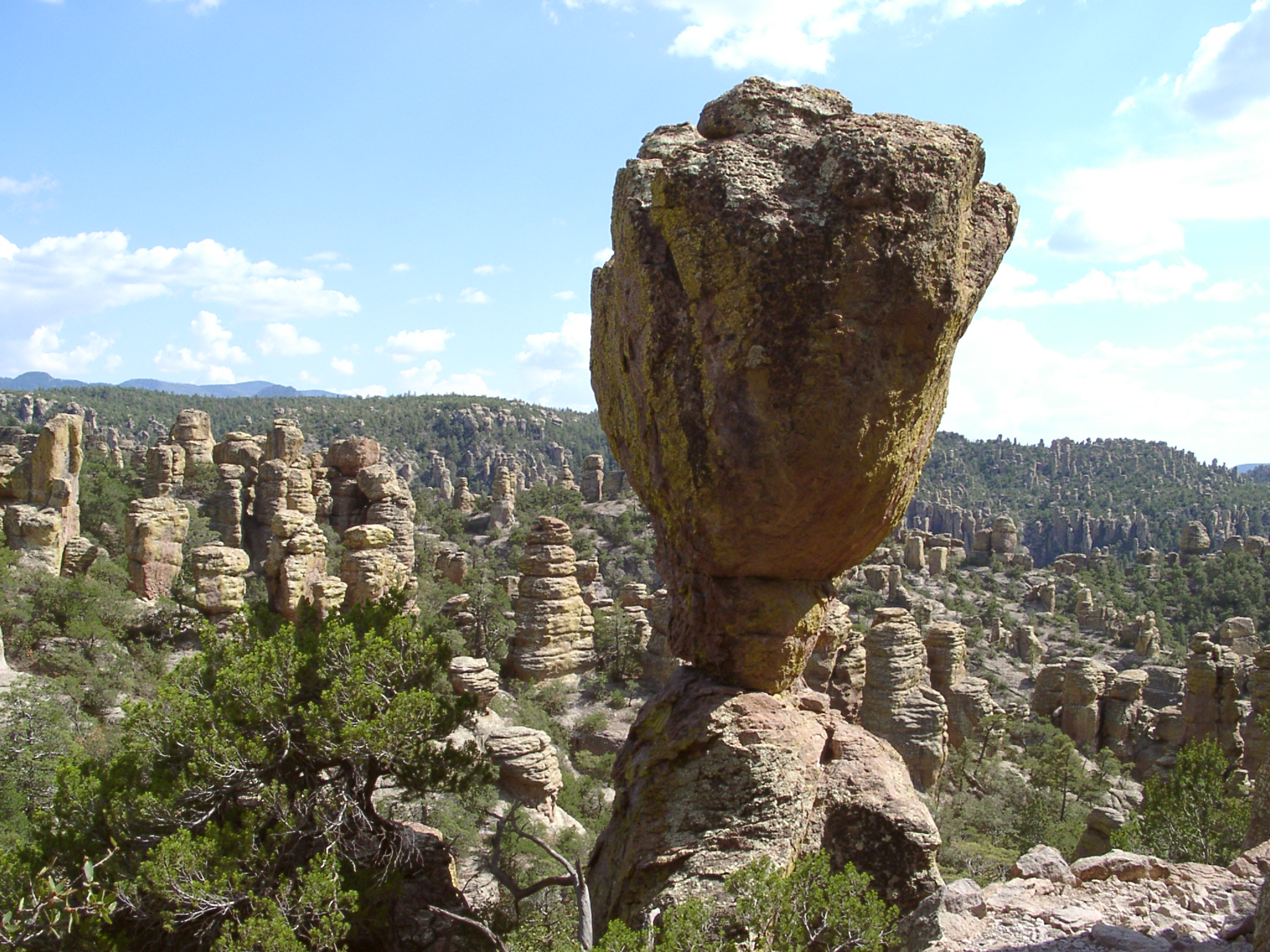
The Chiricahua balanced rock formation

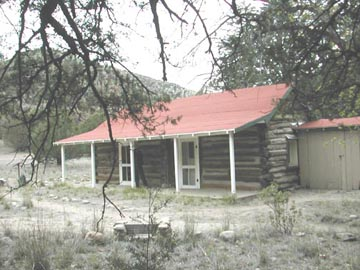
Stafford Cabin

In 2008, the Chiricahua National Monument Historic Designed Landscape, covering roughly 80% of the national monument, was listed on the National Register of Historic Places.

The national monument is part and belongs to the National Park System. It located in the Chiricahua Mountains of southeastern Arizona within Willcox. The monument was established on April 18, 1924, to protect its extensive hoodoos and balancing rocks.

The Stafford Cabin in the Faraway Ranch is one of the first homestead dwellings in the Chiricahua Mountains vicinity. The cabin, built in 1880, is also among the oldest surviving log cabins in the region. Ja Hu Stafford was a pioneer settler who was born in Davidson County, North Carolina, to John Wesley and Clementine Reid Stafford. Stafford found the Chiricahua Mountain area to his liking and built a log cabin which was a small 14 square foot structure made with unpeeled logs, suggesting that it was built in a hurry. A second log room about the same size as the first was added sometime before 1885, followed by a small wooden-frame addition on the backside of the house around 1898. He dug an irrigation system which provided water for his fruit orchard.

Ja Hu received his homestead certificate on April 6, 1886. He lived there with his wife Pauline and their six children for twenty years. In 1919 the cabin was remodeled and served as a guest cabin for the Faraway Ranch. The Stafford Cabin was listed in the National Register of Historic Places on March 31, 1975; reference #75000171.

== Historic buildings ==
The following is a brief description of some of the historic buildings in Railroad Avenue. The avenue became the Commercial center for the growth of Willcox and the Sulpher Springs Valley from the time of the construction of the Southern Pacific Railroad through the area in 1880. Listed in the National Register of Historic Places on May 27, 1987; #87000751. The Sulpher Springs Valley Historical Society and Arizona Historical Society have placed markers on various of these properties.

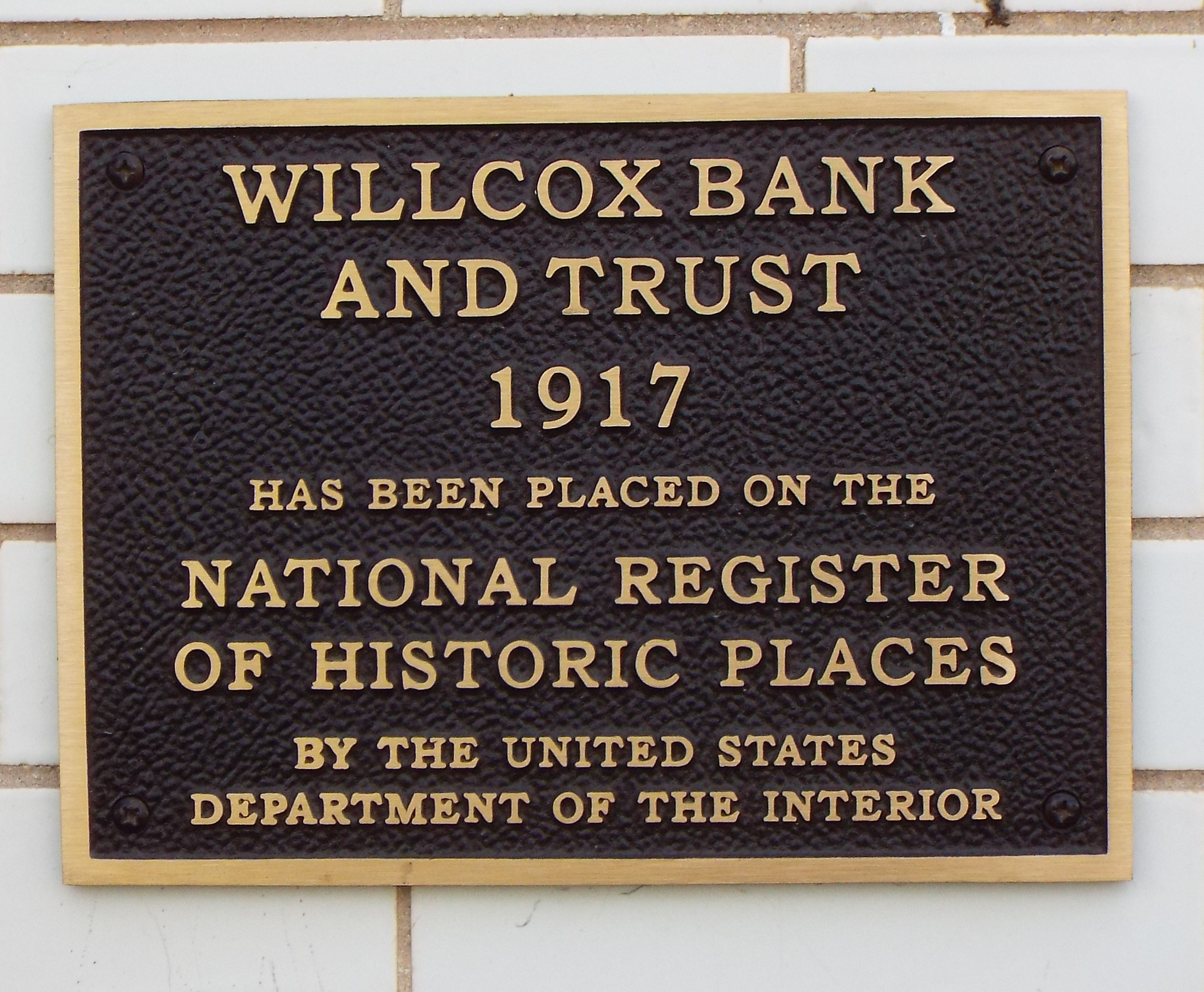
Willcox Bank and Trust

- The Southern Pacific Railroad Depot – built in 1880. This is the only remaining original redwood frame Southern Pacific R.R. Station in Arizona. It is also the only known, original, on site, passenger depot still extant on the Southern – Trans – Continental Railroad route, between Los Angeles and Chicago. Listed on the National Register of Historic Places. The depot is now the Willcox City Hall.
- Palace Saloon and Pool Hall – built in 1905. This is the earliest panel brick style commercial building in Willcox. Was a meat market during prohibition. Listed on the National Register of Historic Places.

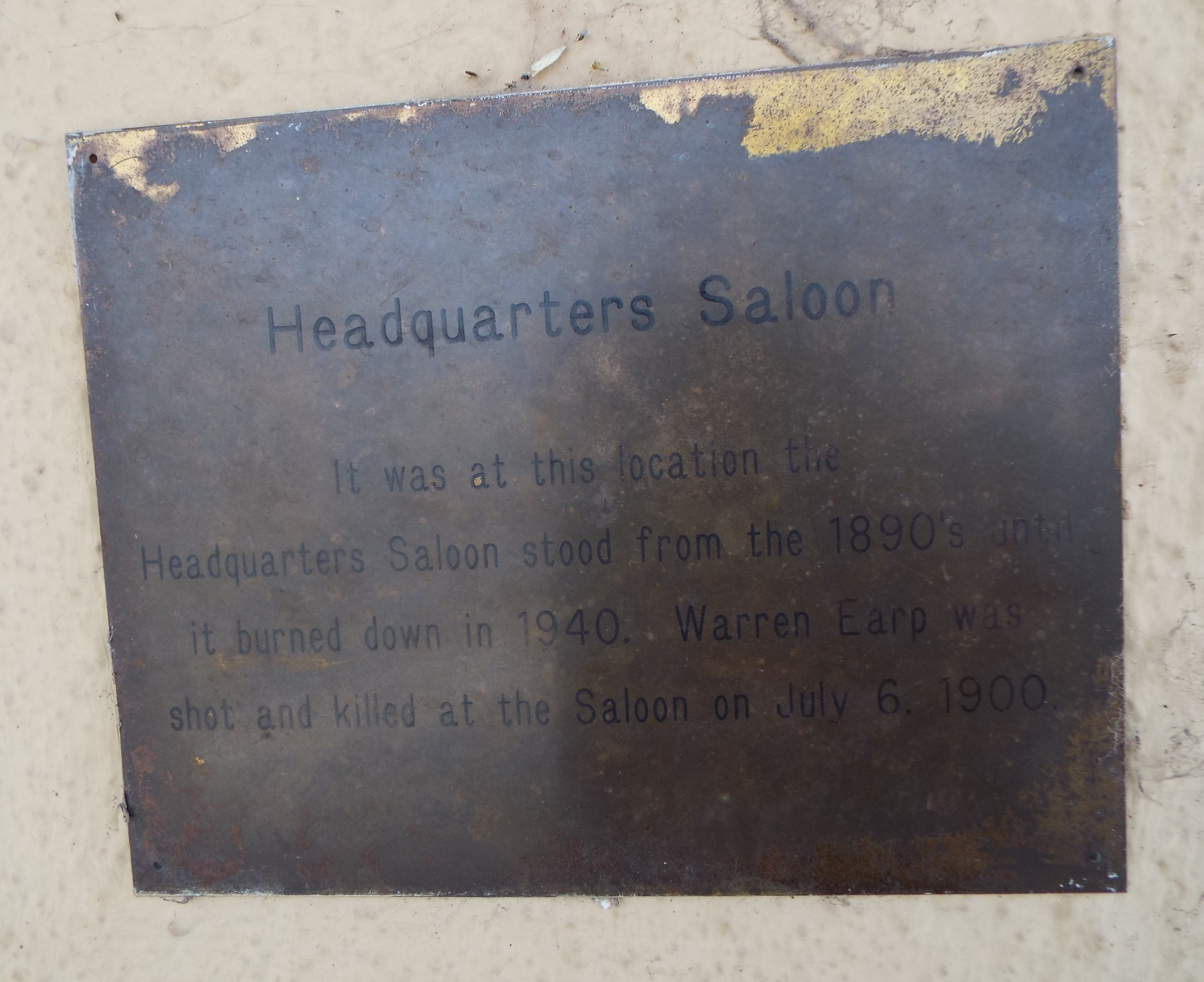
Headquarters Saloon

- Headquarters Saloon – It was at this location the Headquarters Saloon stood from the 1890s until it burned down in 1940. Warren Earp was shot and killed in the Saloon on July 6, 1900. Listed on the National Register of Historic Places.
- Willcox Commercial Hotel – built in 1916. The historical marker inscription reads as follows: Primarily used as headquarters for traveling salesmen using the Southern Pacific R .R. for transportation. Restored in 1987 by the Brown Family to be used as an ice cream parlor and office suites. Listed on the National Register of Historic Places.
- The Toggery – built in 1925. The historical marker inscription reads as follows: Built by Thomas A. Huffman. The Toggery was originally constructed as a single unit and later Mr. Huffman built the adjacent building. Huffman's Toggery was established in 1916 as part of the Commercial Development of Willcox. Listed on the National Register of Historic Places.
- The Willcox Women's Community Center – built in 1936 and located at 312 W. Stewart. The historical marker inscription reads as follows: Was constructed by P. Howard Pregenzer and crew; In Memory of P. Howard Pregenzer 1894–1980; Resident of Willcox, Arizona 1927–1980; Construction began in 1934 and completed in 1936; Construction sponsored by the City of Willcox, Arizona in year 1936; United States of America work project administration (WPA); Construction project O. P. No. 65–2–166. Listed in the National Register of Historic Places on May 27, 1987, reference: #87000740.
- John H. Norton and Company Store – built in 1880 and located at 180 N. Railroad Ave. The building was listed in the National Register of Historic Places on March 31, 1983, reference: #83002987.
- Willcox Theater – built in 1936 and located at 134 N. Railroad Avenue. Listed on the National Register of Historic Places.
- Willcox Bank and Trust – built in 1917 and located at 154 N. Railroad Ave. Listed on the National Register of Historic Places.
- Willcox Retail Store – built in 1916 and located on Maley Street. Listed on the National Register of Historic Places.
- Masonic Lodge #10 – built in 1916 and located at the corner of Marley and Haskell Streets. The lodge was originally chartered on November 11, 1891. Listed on the National Register of Historic Places.
- Schley Saloon built in 1893 and located at 150 N Railroad Ave. Originally the George Raum's Fashion Saloon and in 1897 the Schley Saloon. The saloon became a grocery store on eve of prohibition. The building now houses the Rex Allen Museum and Cowboy Hall of Fame. Listed on the National Register of Historic Places.

=== Historic buildings pictured ===
Historic Buildings
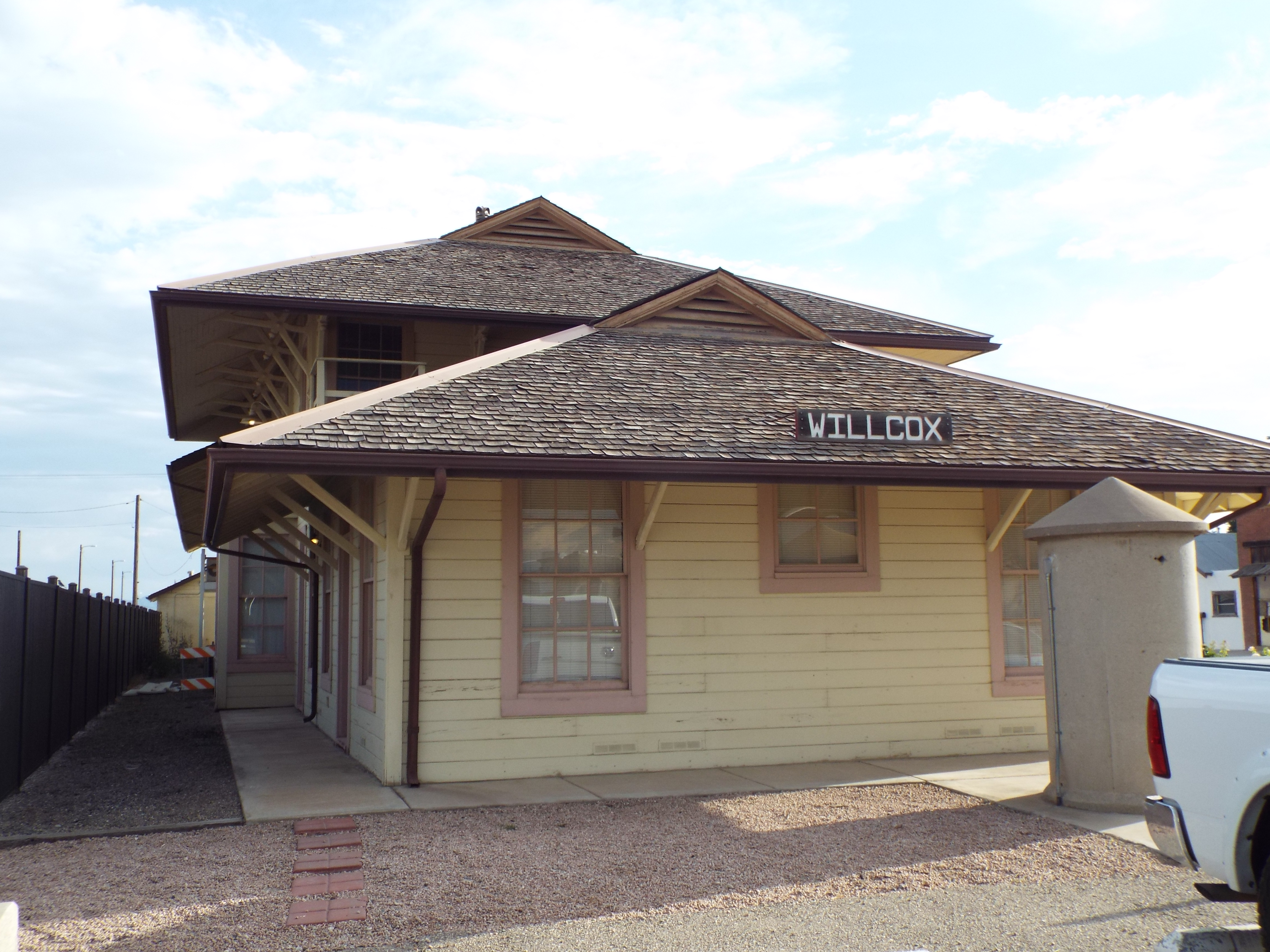
Willcox Southern Pacific Railroad Depot – 1880

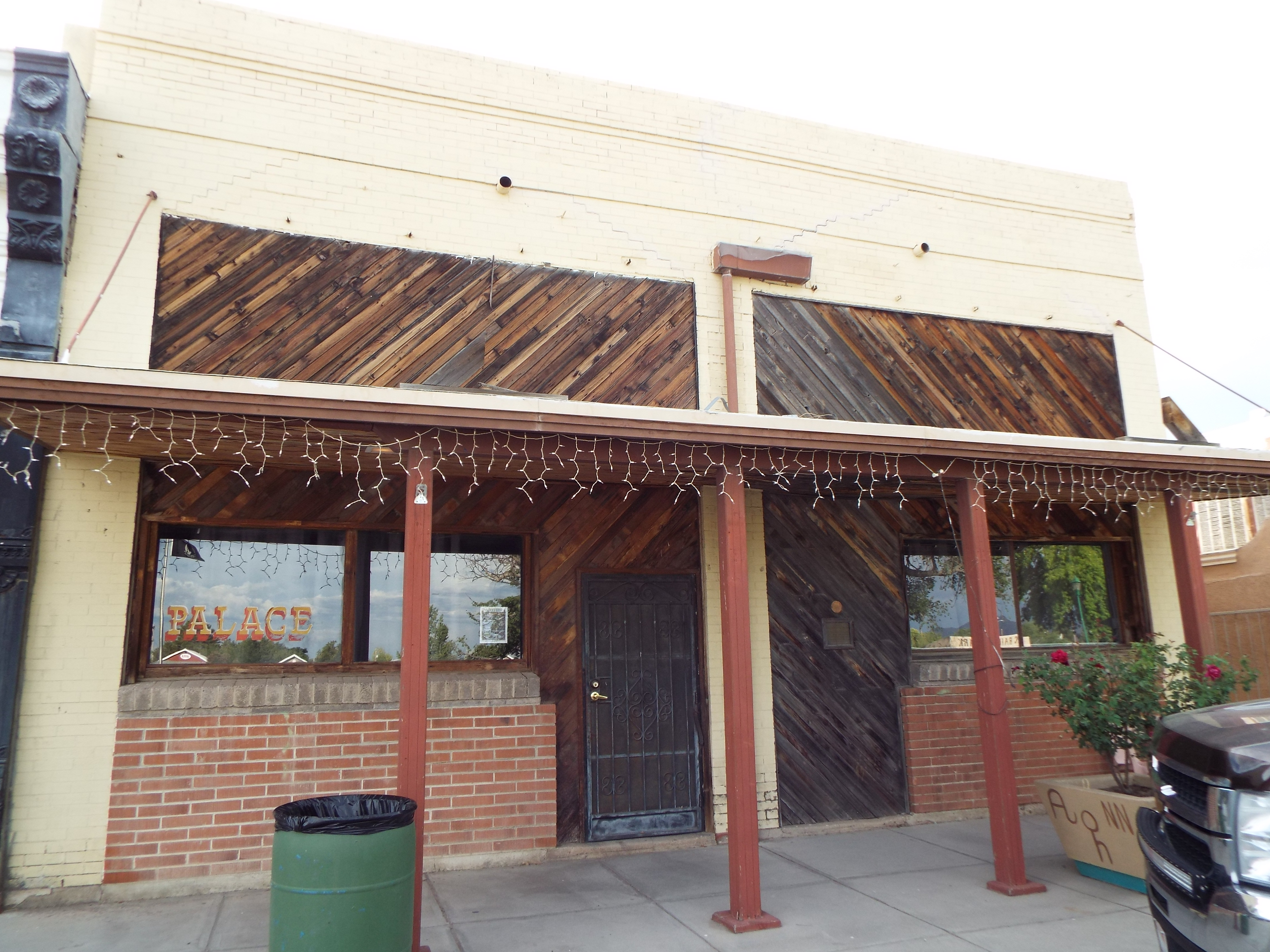
Palace Saloon and Pool Hall – 1905

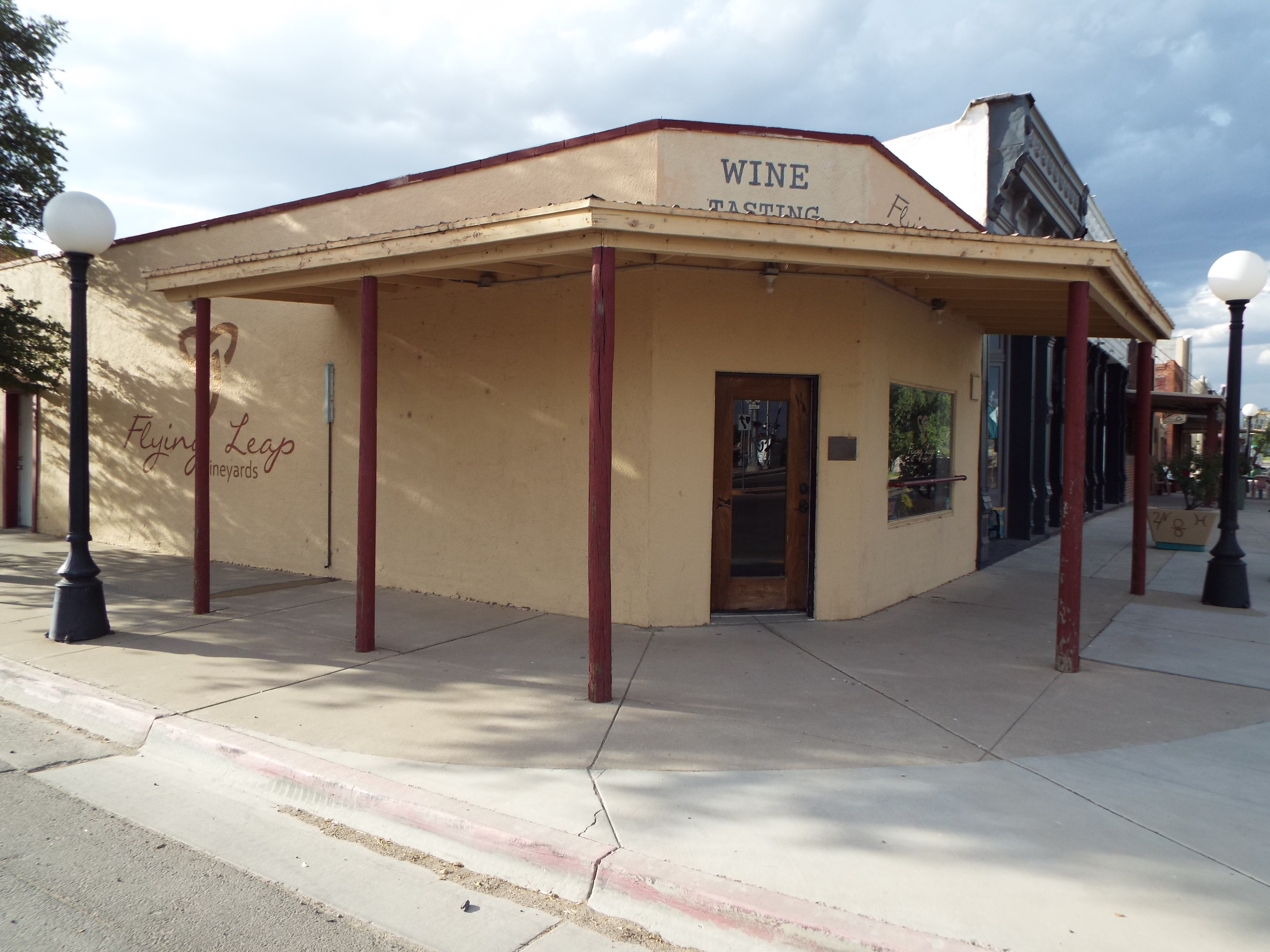
Headquarters Saloon – 1890/1905

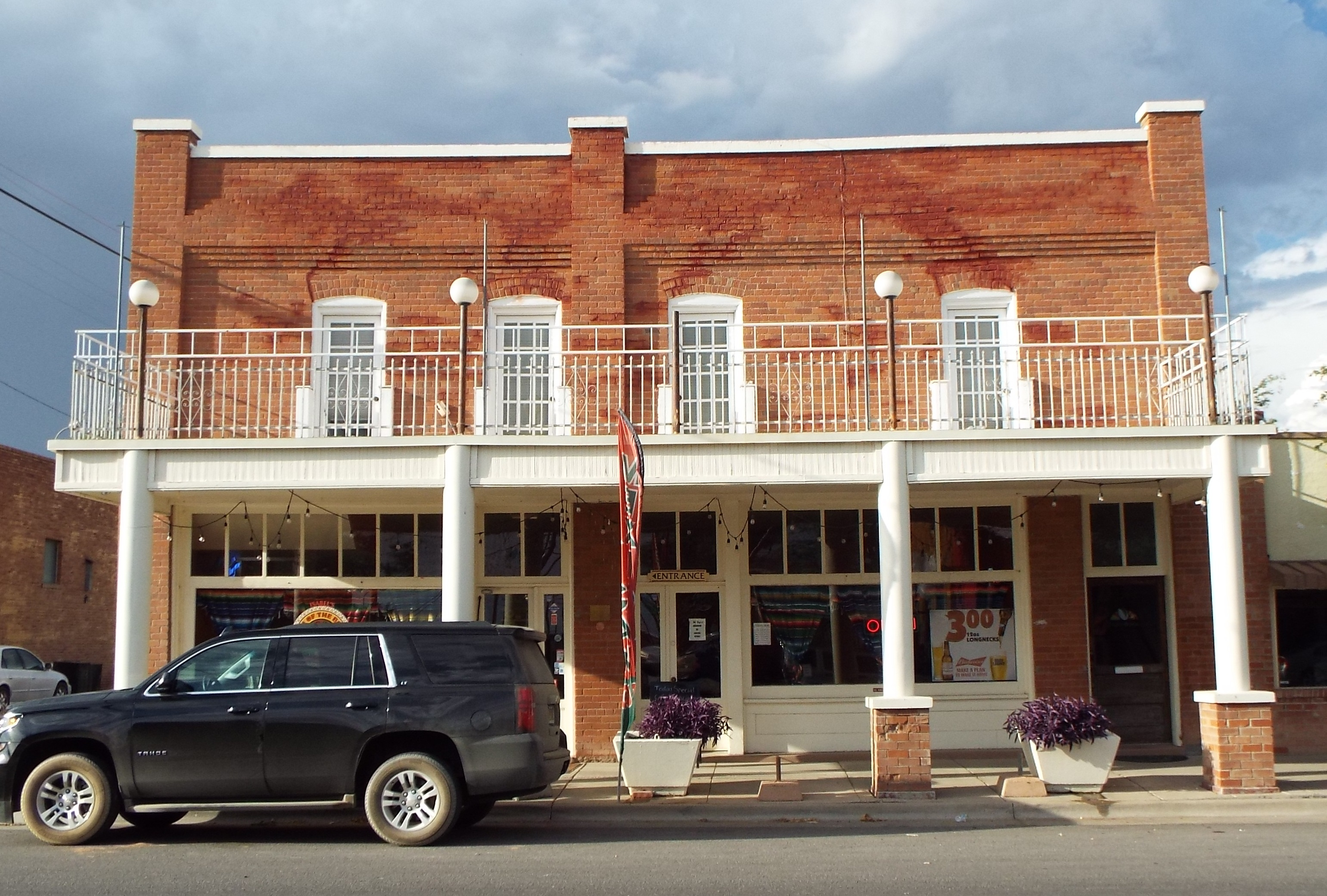
Willcox Commercial Hotel – 1916

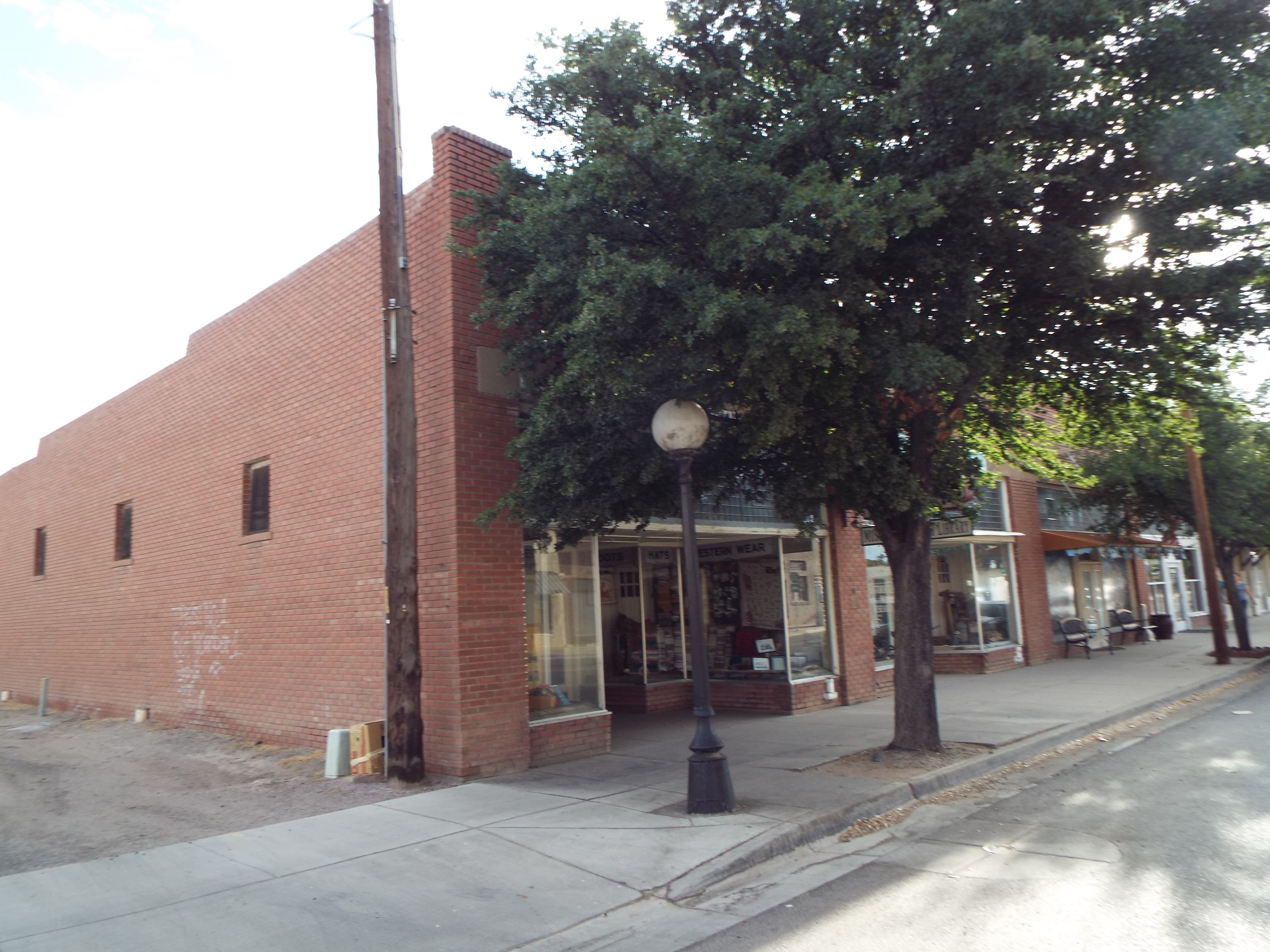
The Toggery – 1926

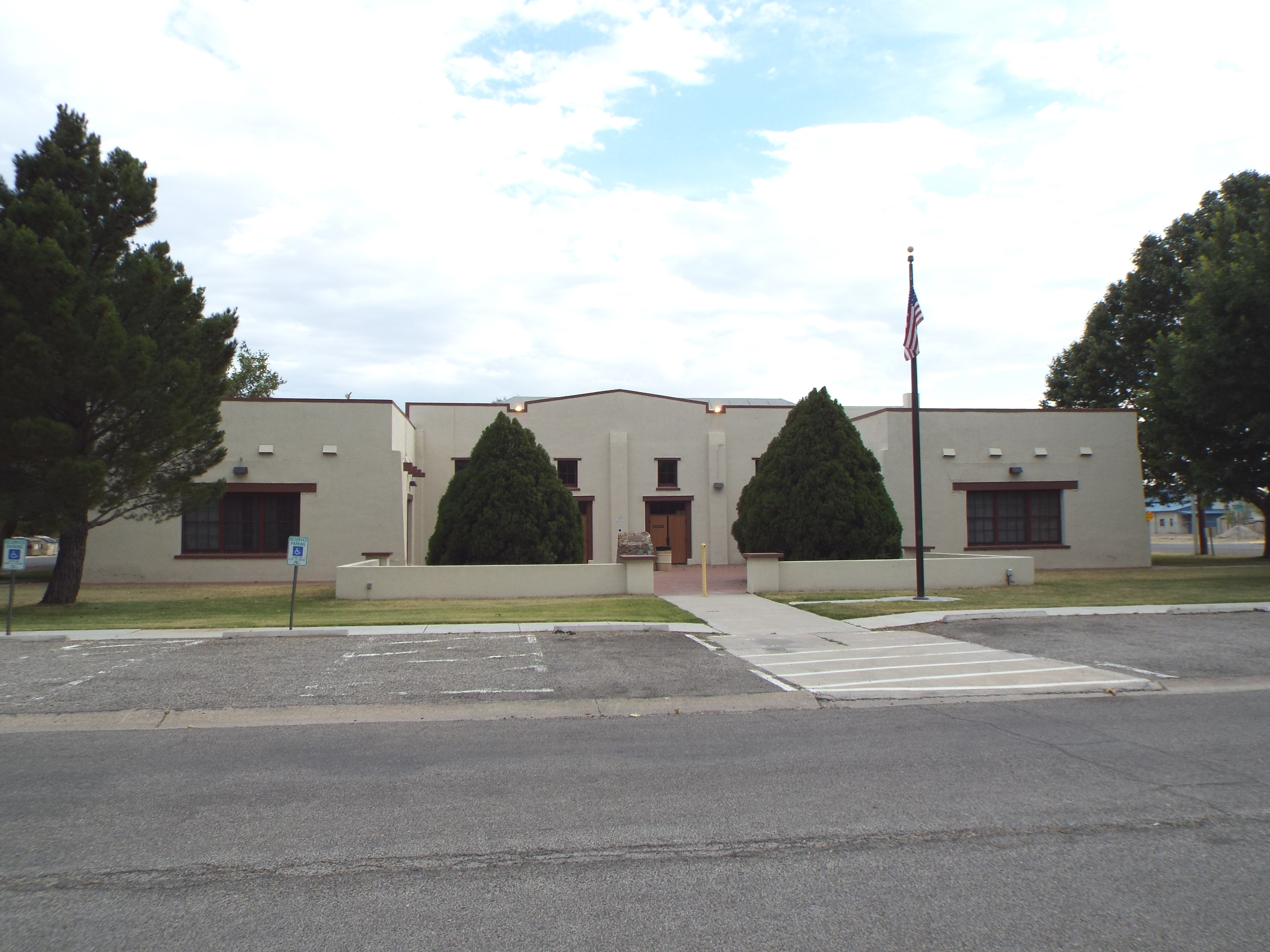
Willcox Women's Club – 1936

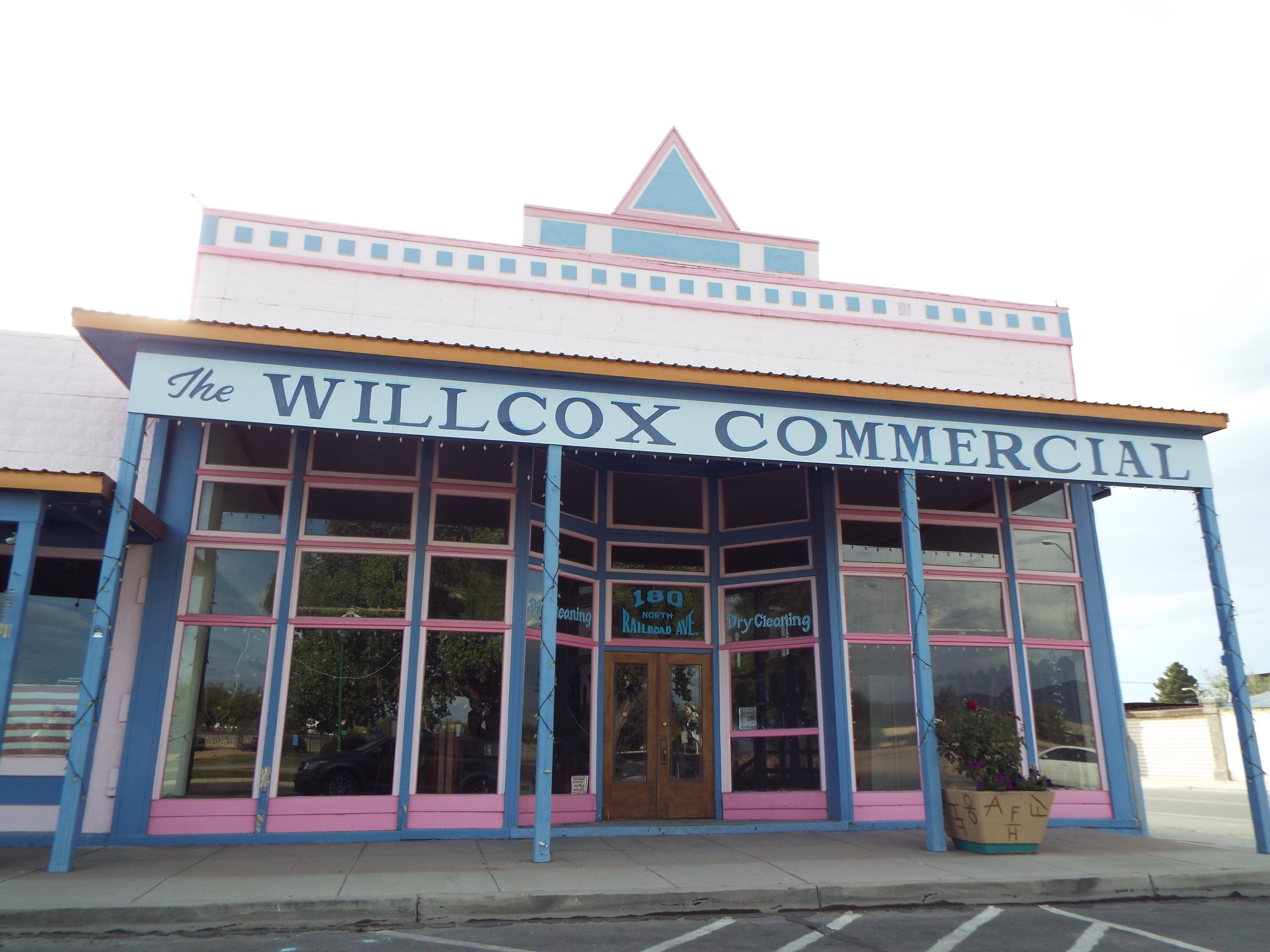
John H. Norton and Company Store – 1880

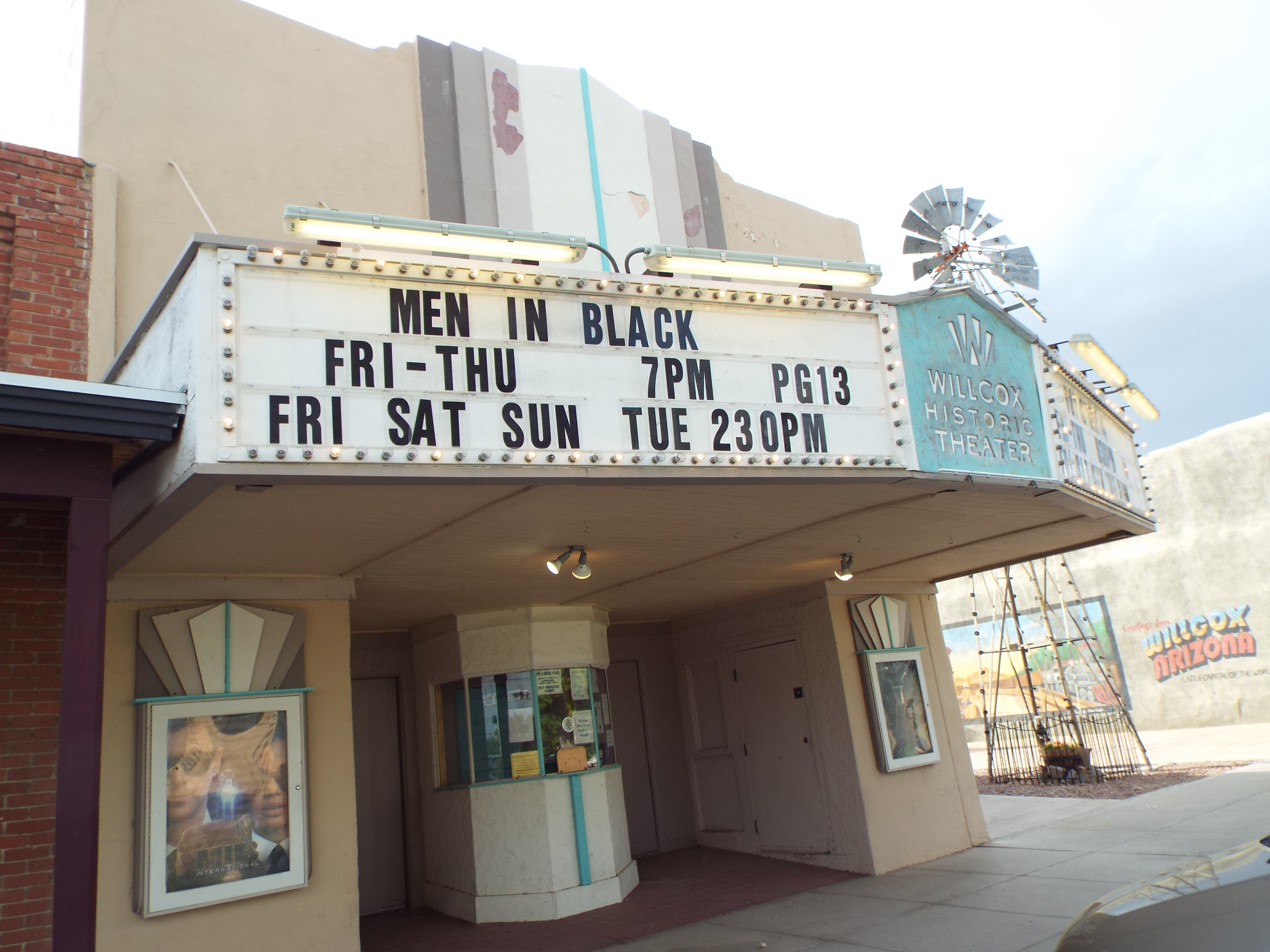
Willcox Theater – 1936

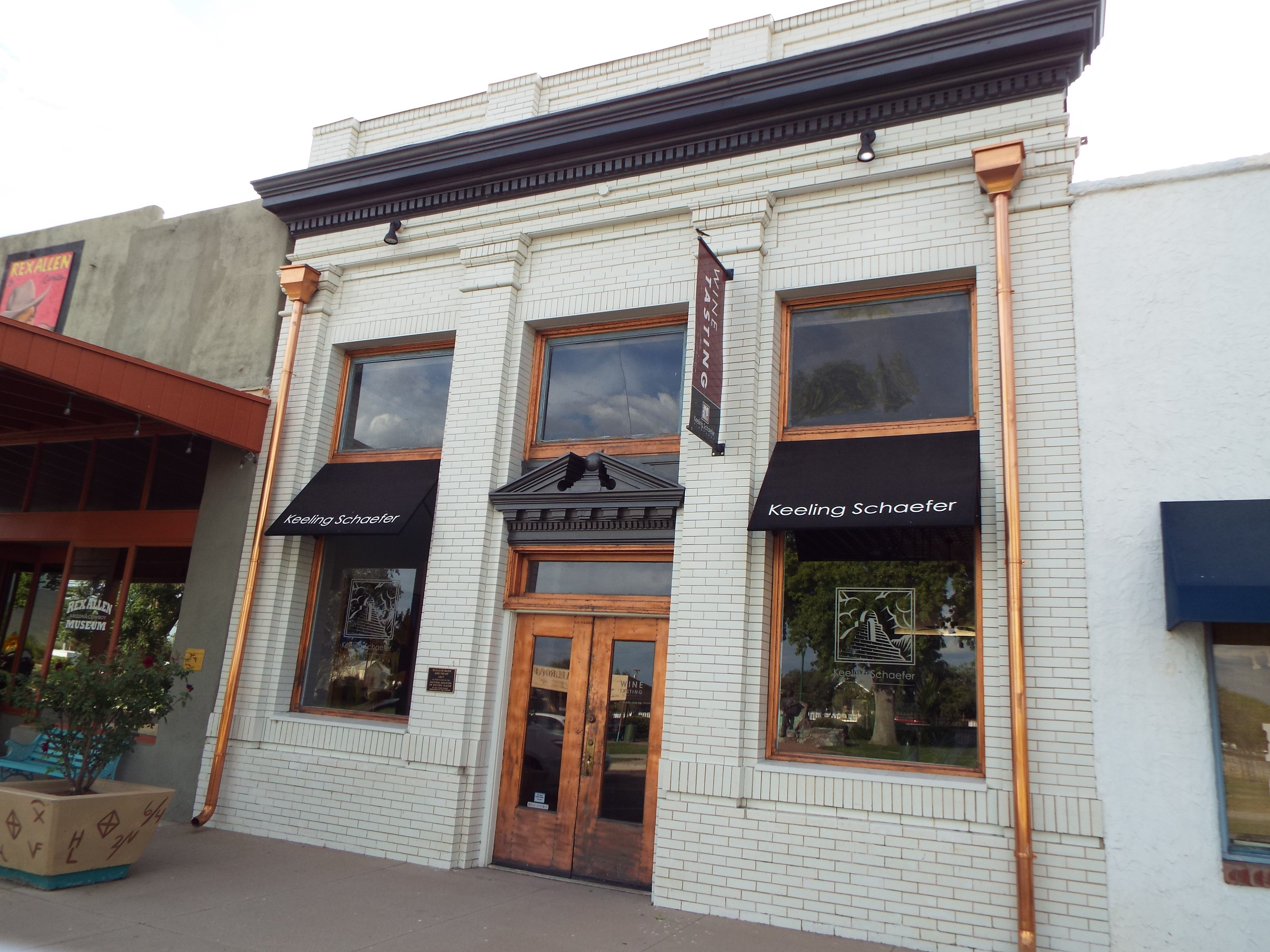
Willcox Bank and Trust – 1917

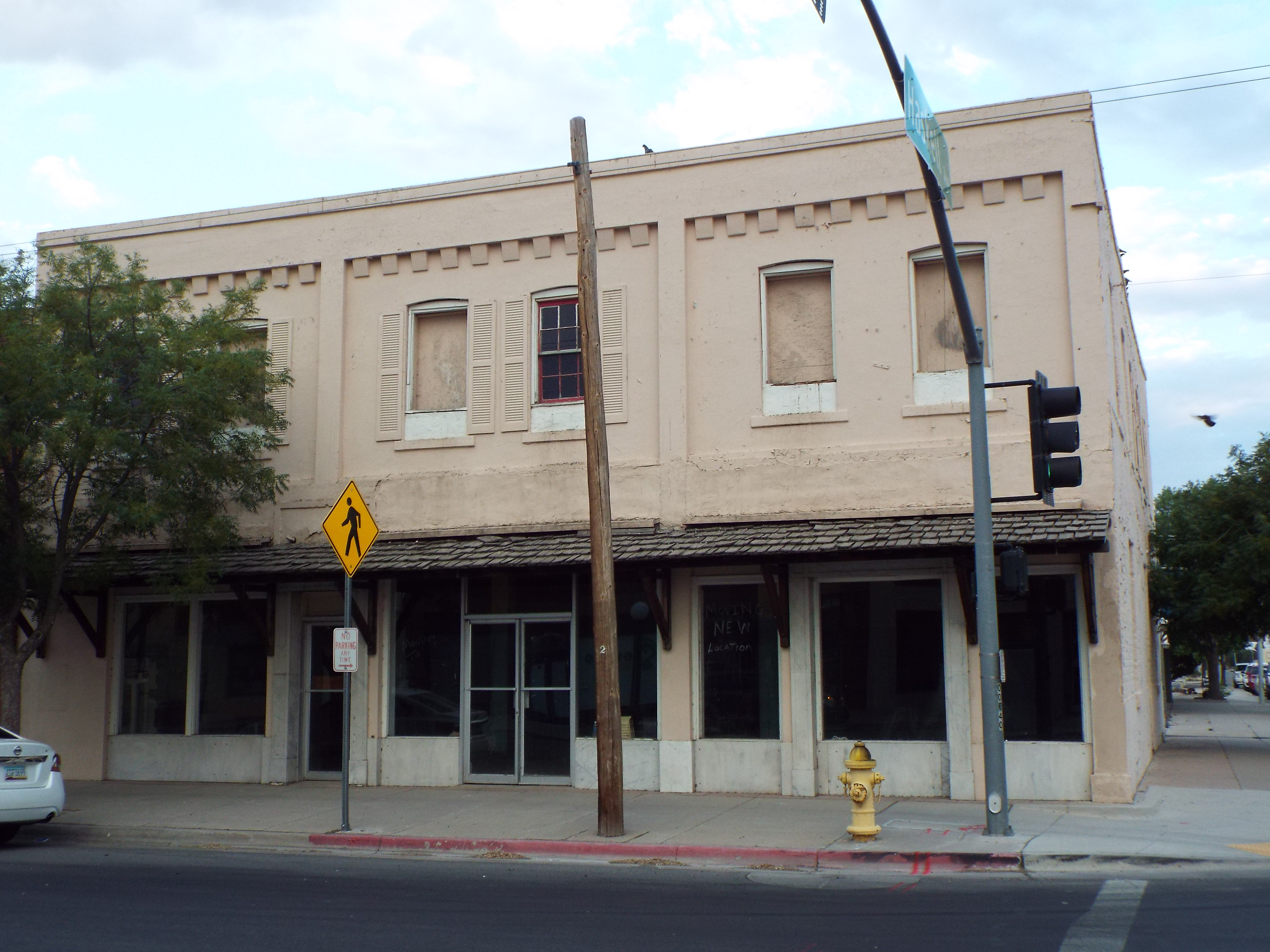
Willcox Retail Store – 1916

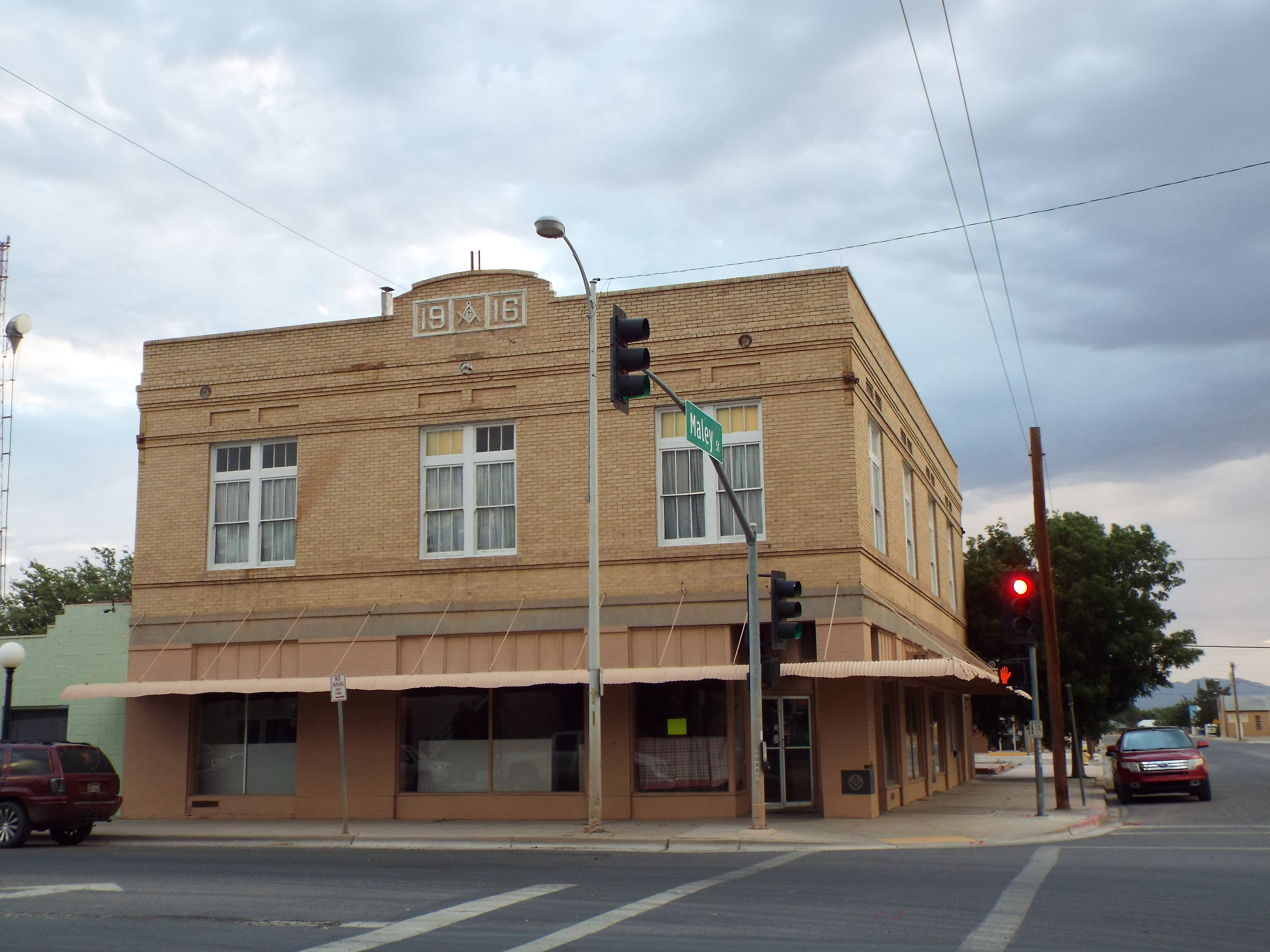
Masonic Lodge #10 – 1916

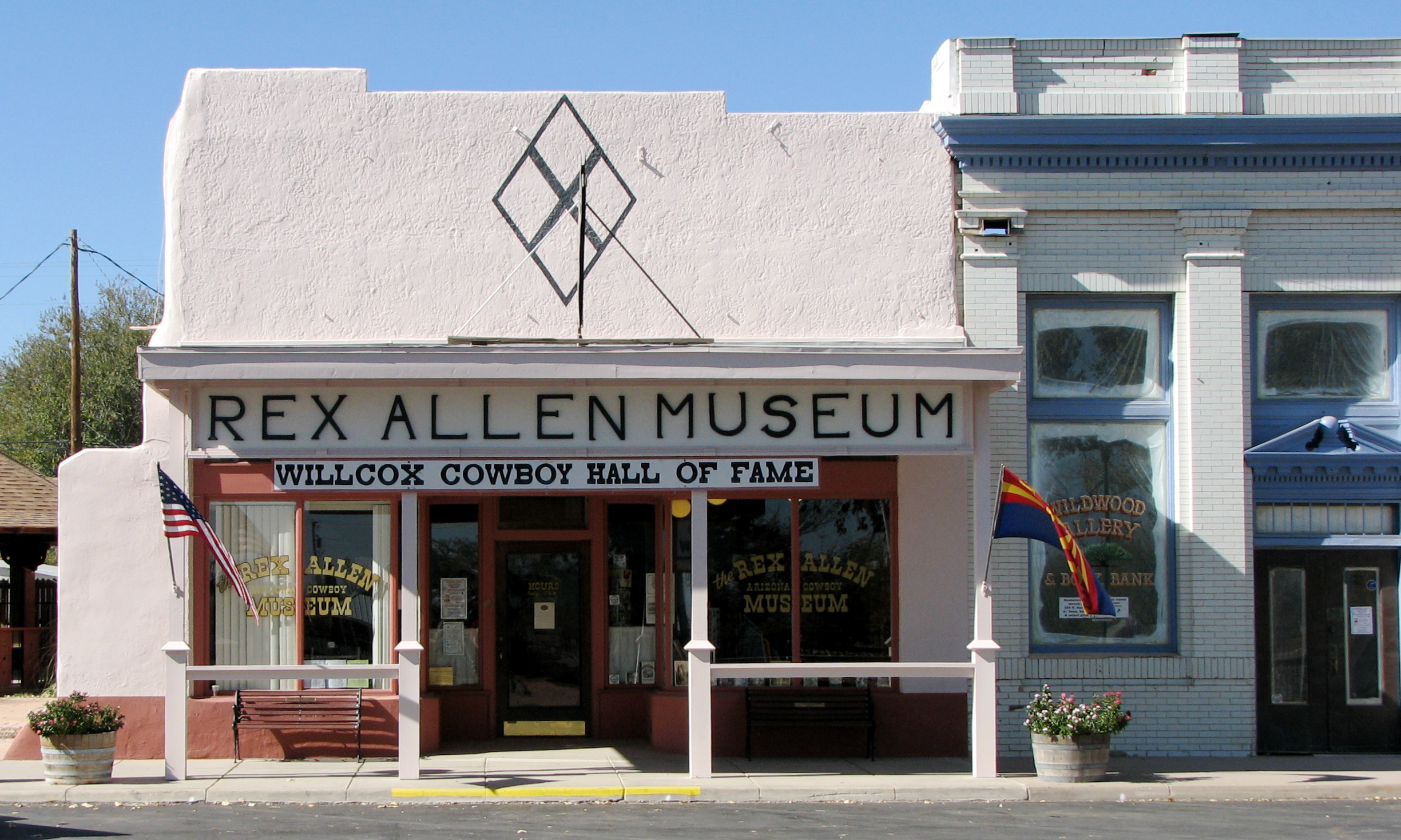
Schley Saloon now the Rex Allen Museum – 1893

== Historic houses ==
Several of the houses listed here are "town homes" built before the turn of the century by wealthy cattle ranchers in the Sulphur Spring Valley, example: the Mee House, the Hooker Town House, the Johnson/Tillotson House and the Saxon House. The following are the historic houses in Willcox which are listed in the National Register of Historic Places:

- The Benjamin E. Briscoe House – built in 1898 and located at 358 N. Bowie St. Listed in the National Register of Historic Places on May 27, 1987, reference: #87000737.
- The John Gung'l House – built in 1920 and located at 210 S. Austin Blvd. The plans for the building of the house were that Mr. Gung'l had prepared in El Paso where he obtained the hard fired brick used in construction of the 1 1/2-story residence. Listed in the National Register of Historic Places on May 27, 1987, reference:#87000749
- The Johnson-Tillotson House – built in 1900 and located at 124 N. Curtis St. The Tillotson House is the only Western Colonial Revival style residence in the Multiple Resource Area (MRA) and represents an early, ca. 1900, shift from the previously utilized Queen Anne style. Listed in the National Register of Historic Places on August 6, 1987, reference: #87000743.
- The Joe Mee House – built in 1920 and located at 265 W. Stewart St. The one story Mee Home (W025) is a rare and unusual Craftsman Bungalow in that it is constructed of adobe. Stuccoed adobe walls extend up to the eave line on all sides, and the gable end is finished with wood shingles. Listed in the National Register of Historic Places on August 6, 1987, reference: #87000739.
- The Morgan House – built in 1888 and located at 242 E. Maley St. Built by Columbia, California native Henry A. Morgan (1861–1942), one of the founders of Willcox and the 1st mayor of Willcox. Listed in the National Register of Historic Places on August 18, 1987, reference: #87000746.
- The Harry Saxon House – built in 1920 and located at 308 S. Haskell St. The one story Saxon Home has a low gable roof which extends across the main portion of the building and covers the L-shaped veranda. Windows and entry door reveal broad bungalow proportions. Listed in the National Register of Historic Places on May 27, 1987, reference: #87000750.
- The Schwertner House – built in 1880 and located at 124 E. Stewart St. This house was built by Delso Smith as an Army Officer reception center during the Indian wars. It was bought by Mr. Schwertner in 1893. Listed in the National Register of Historic Places on August 25, 1983, reference: #83002986.
- The Pablo Soto House built in 1880 and located at 108 E. Stewart St. Pablo Soto was one of Tucson, 1st school teachers In the early 1880s he moved to Willcox and found a job as a salesman for Norton & Stewart general merchandise store. Pablo and his brother brought the store and established the first banking operation in Willcox in conjunction with their store in about 1888. Deposits were accepted by anyone. Listed in the National Register of Historic Places on August 18, 1987, reference: #87000744.
- The J.C. Wilson House – built in 1900 and located at 258 E. Maley St. In 1908 the Willcox Board of Trade was organized. The members of the board elected Dr. J. C. Wilson as president. Listed in the National Register of Historic Places on August 18, 1987, reference: #87000747.
- The Crowley House – built in 1883 and located at 175 S. Railroad Ave. John F. Crowley was co-owner of the Elite Saloon and Billiard Exchange. He became a Deputy Sheriff and was the person who took into custody those responsible of the Bisbee Massacre. Listed in the National Register of Historic Places on August 6, 1987, reference: #87000748.
- The Hooker Town House – built in 1900 and located at 235 E. Stewart St. Colonel Henry Hooker was a dominant rancher in Southern Arizona cattle industry, and an early land owner. Listed in the National Register of Historic Places on May 27, 1987, reference: #87000736.

=== Historic houses pictured ===
Historic Houses

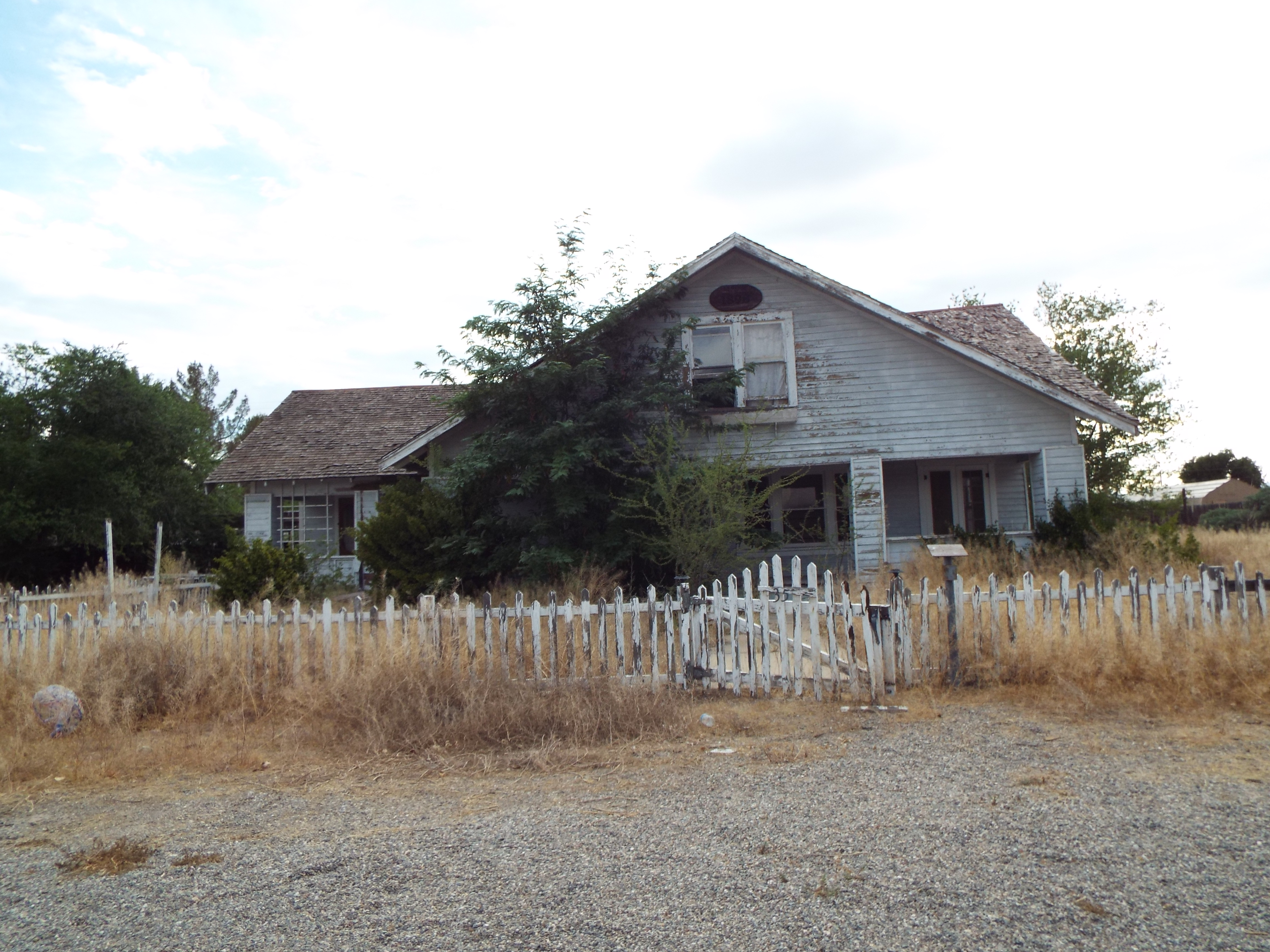
Benjamin E. Briscoe House

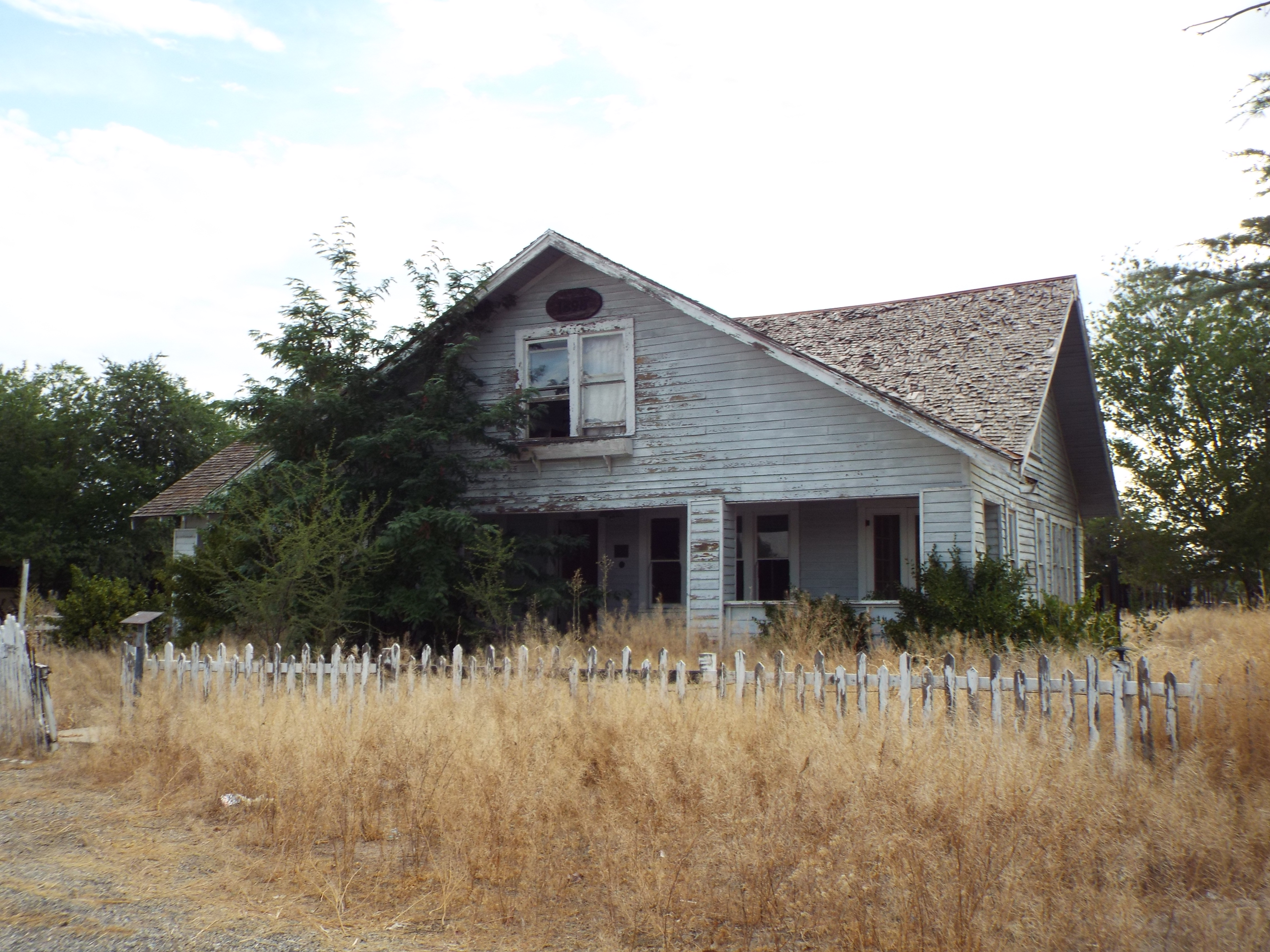
Benjamin E. Briscoe House – 1898

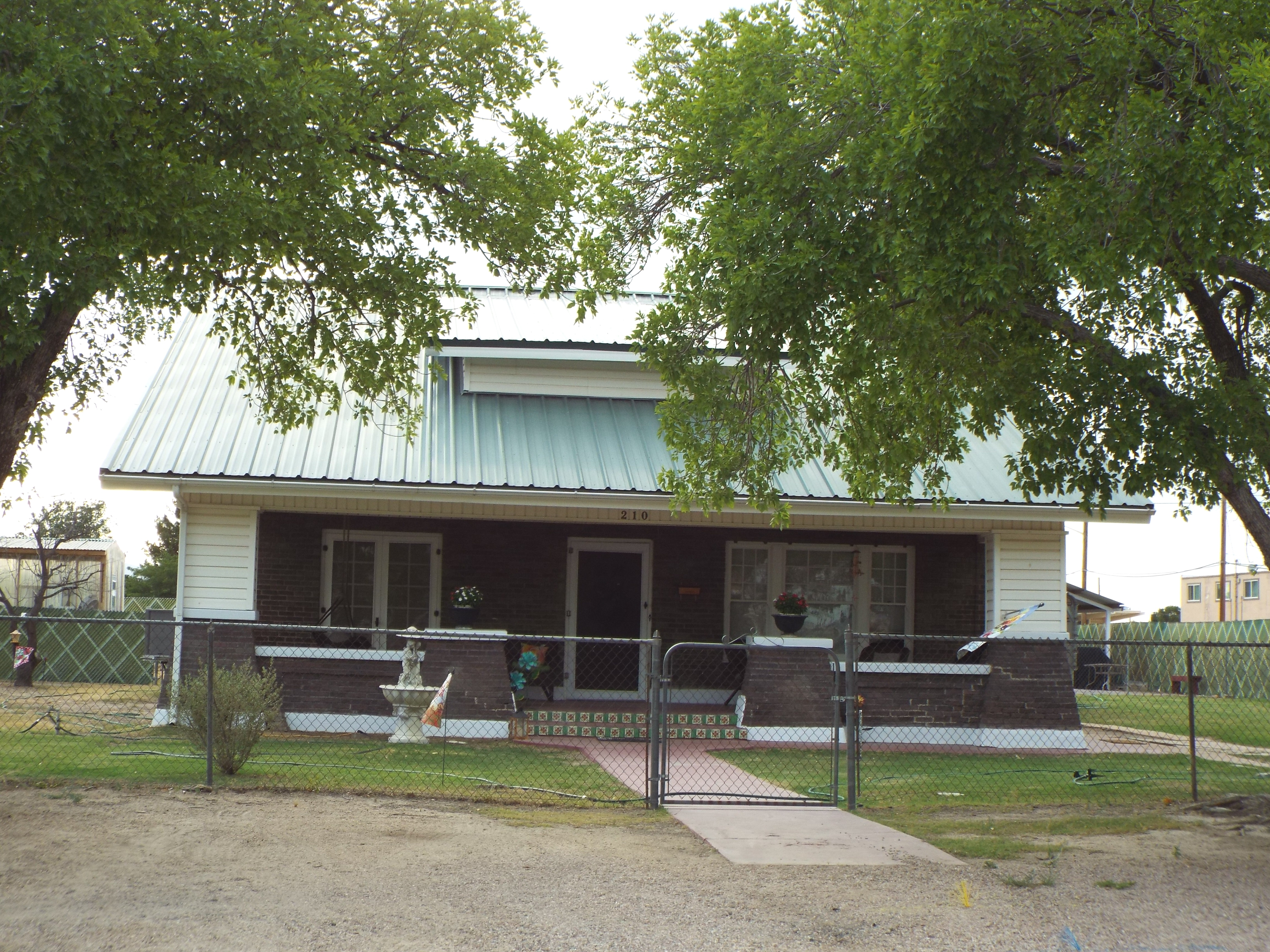
John Gung'l House – 1920

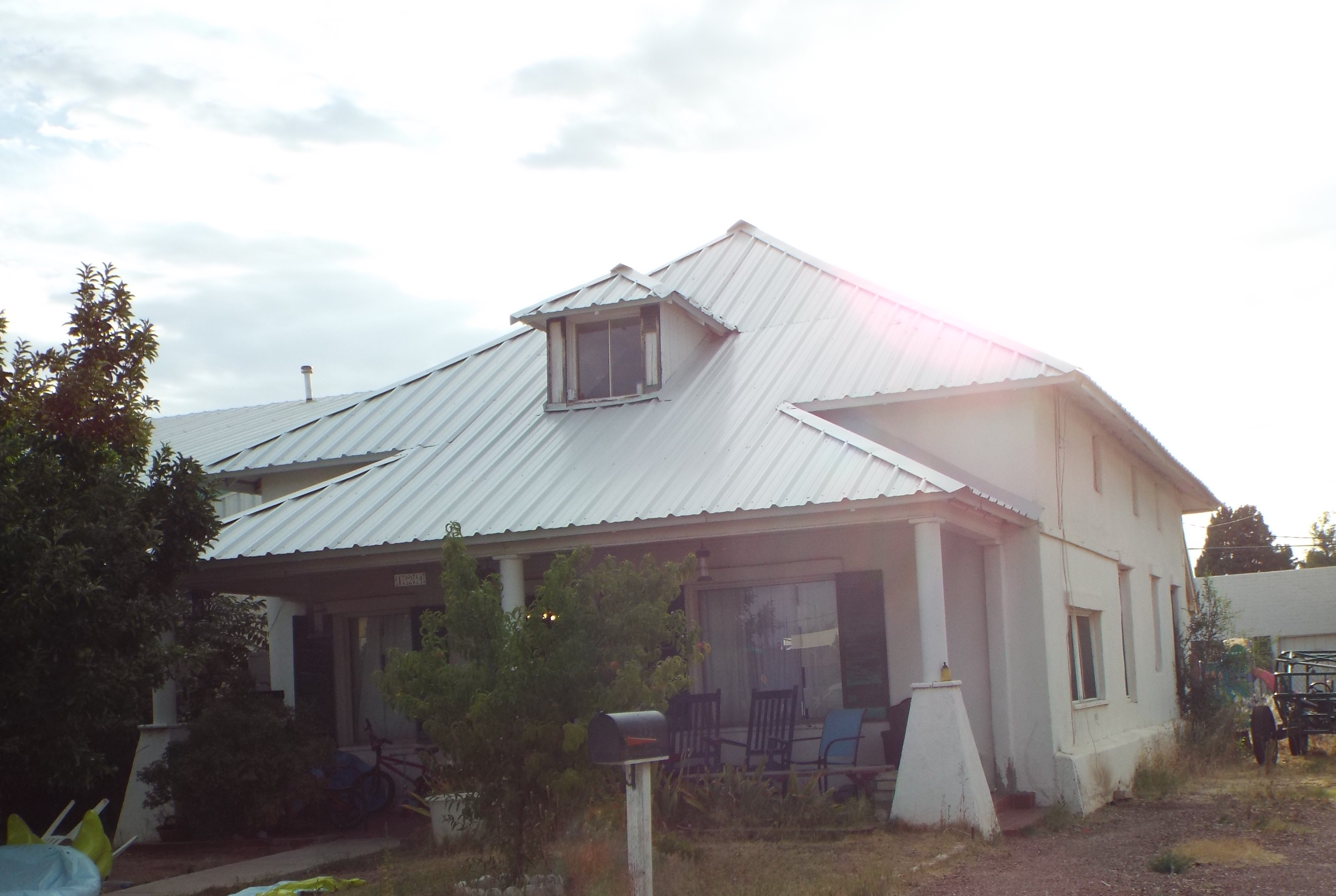
Johnson-Tillotson House – 1900

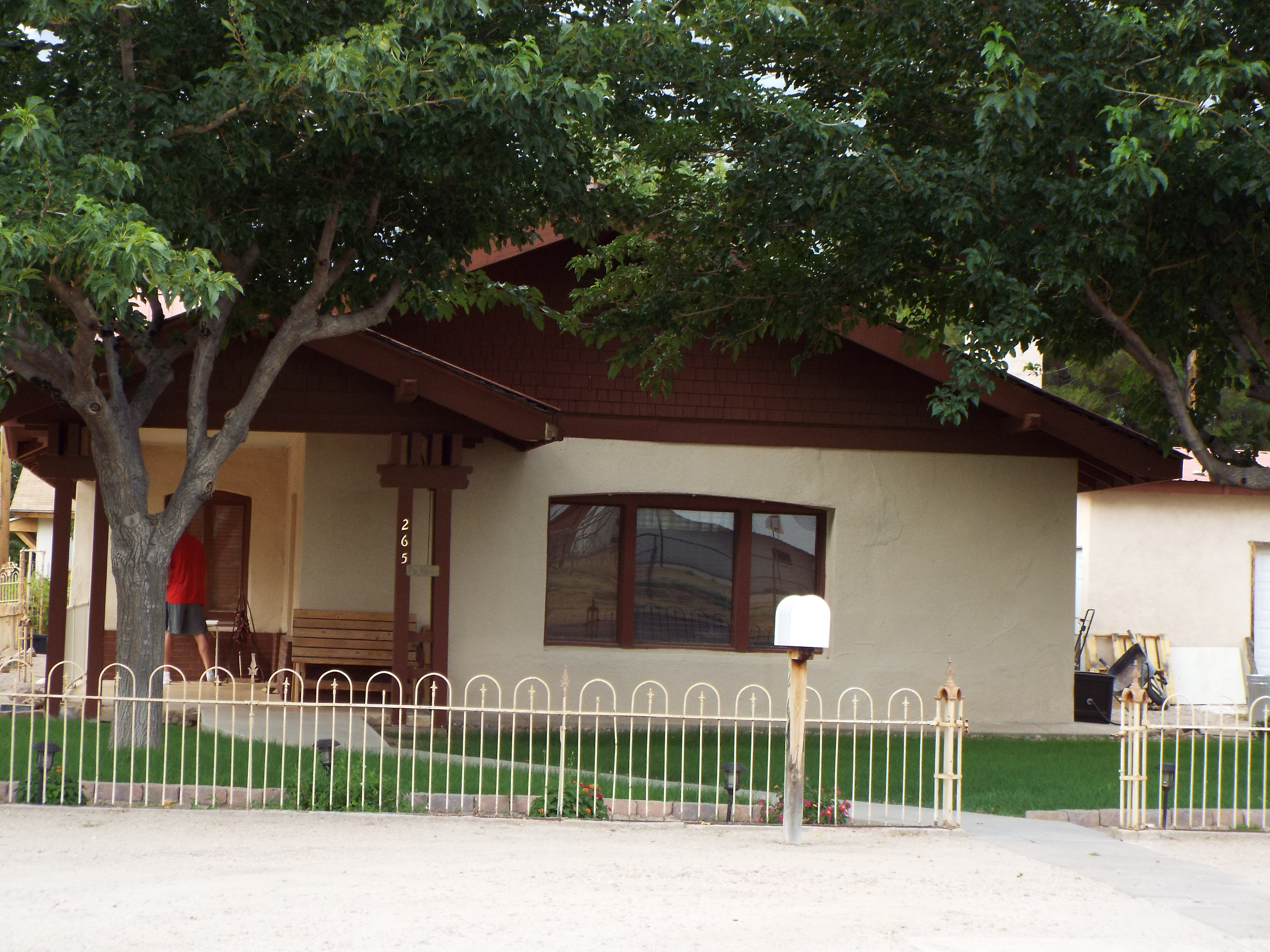
Joe Mee House – 1920

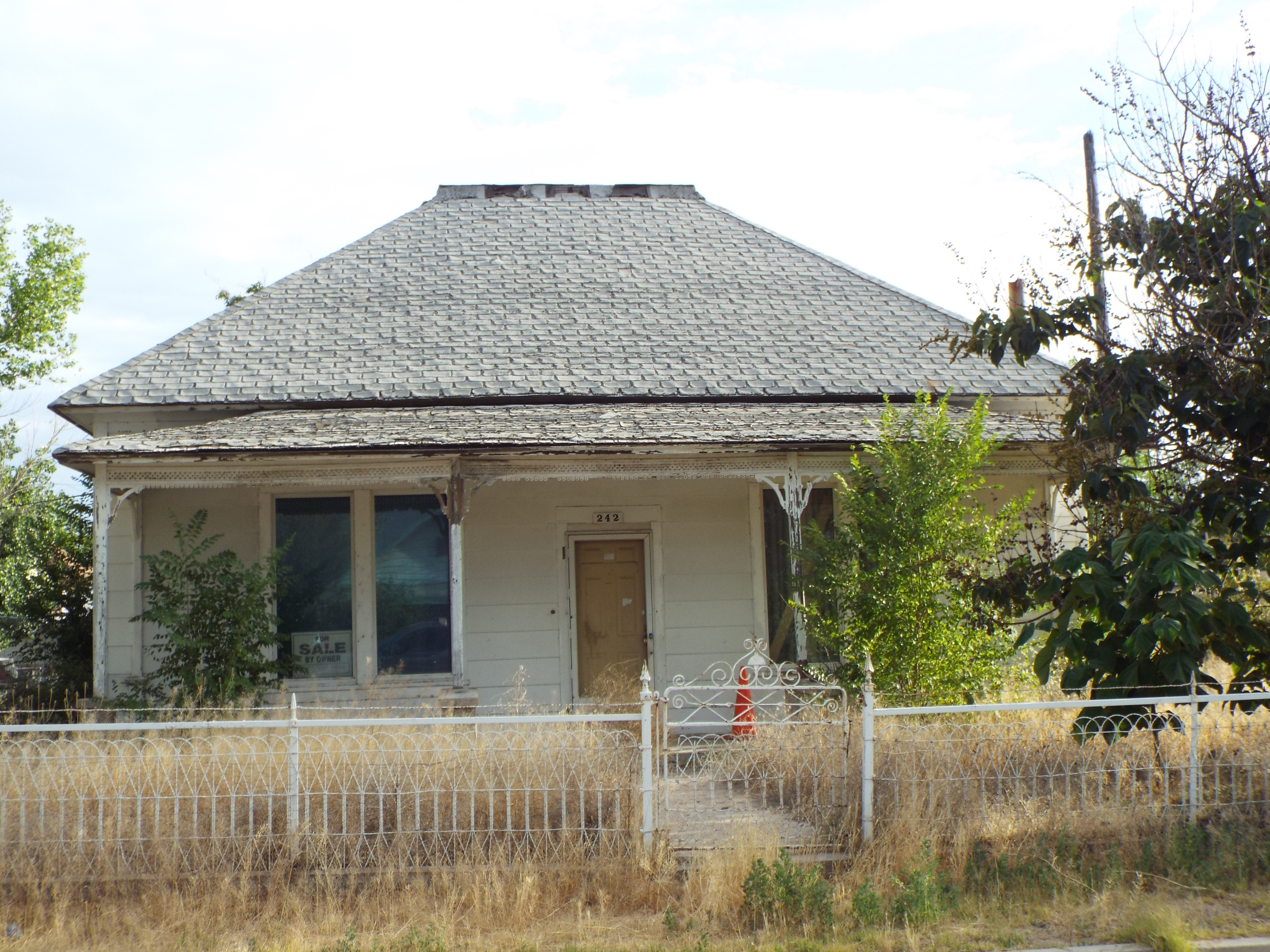
Morgan House – 1888

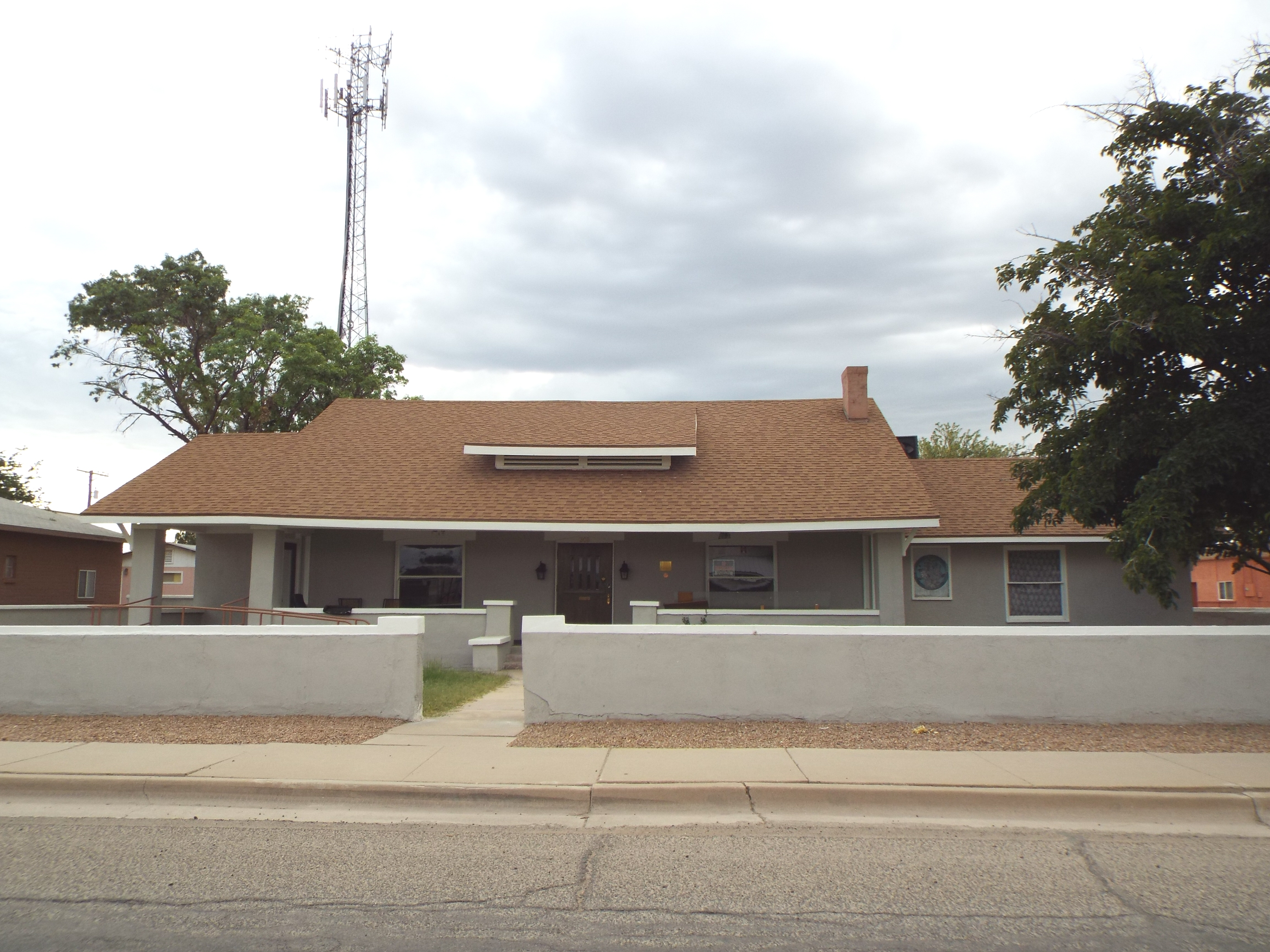
Harry Saxon House – 1920

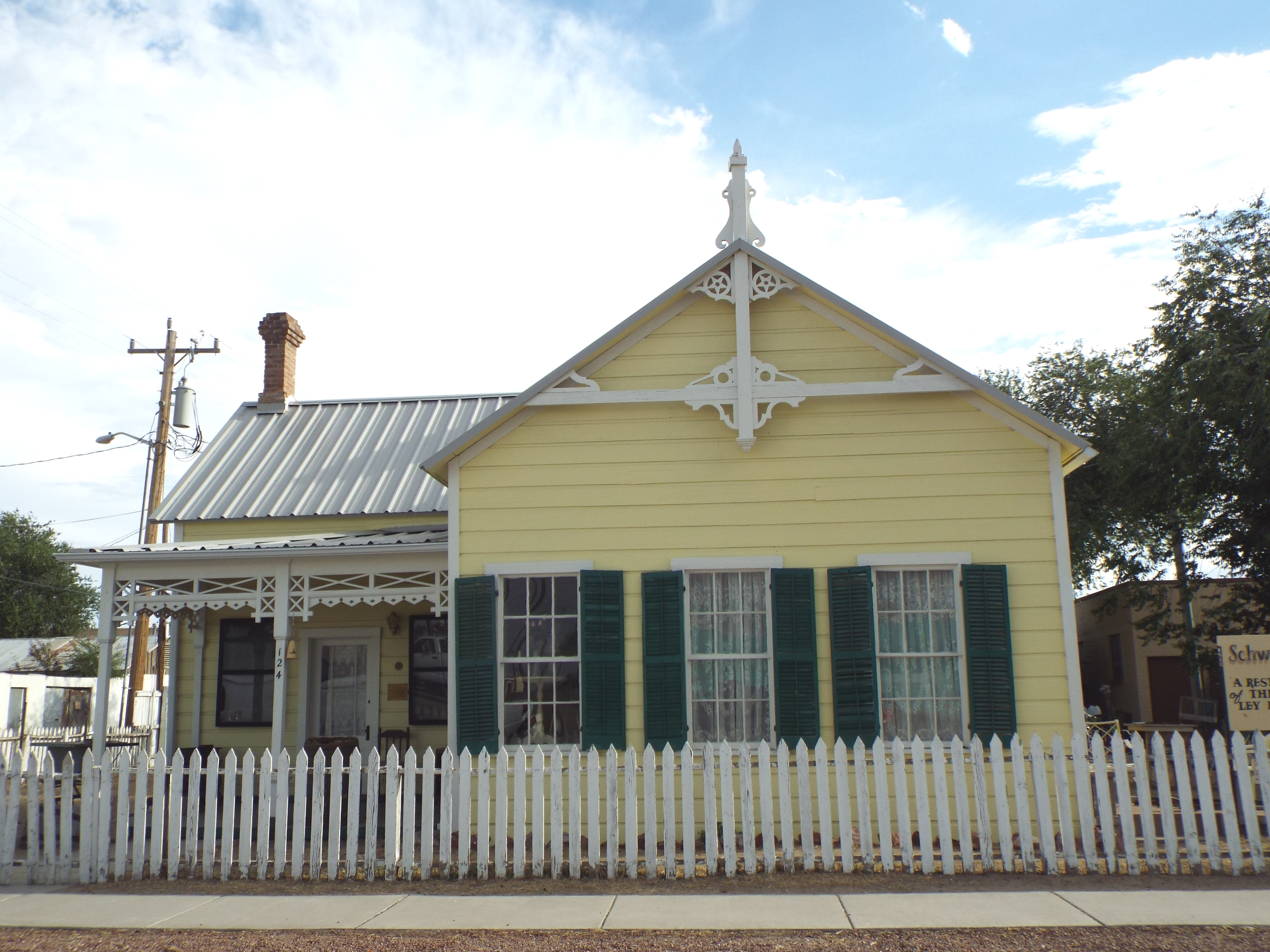
Schwertner House – 1880

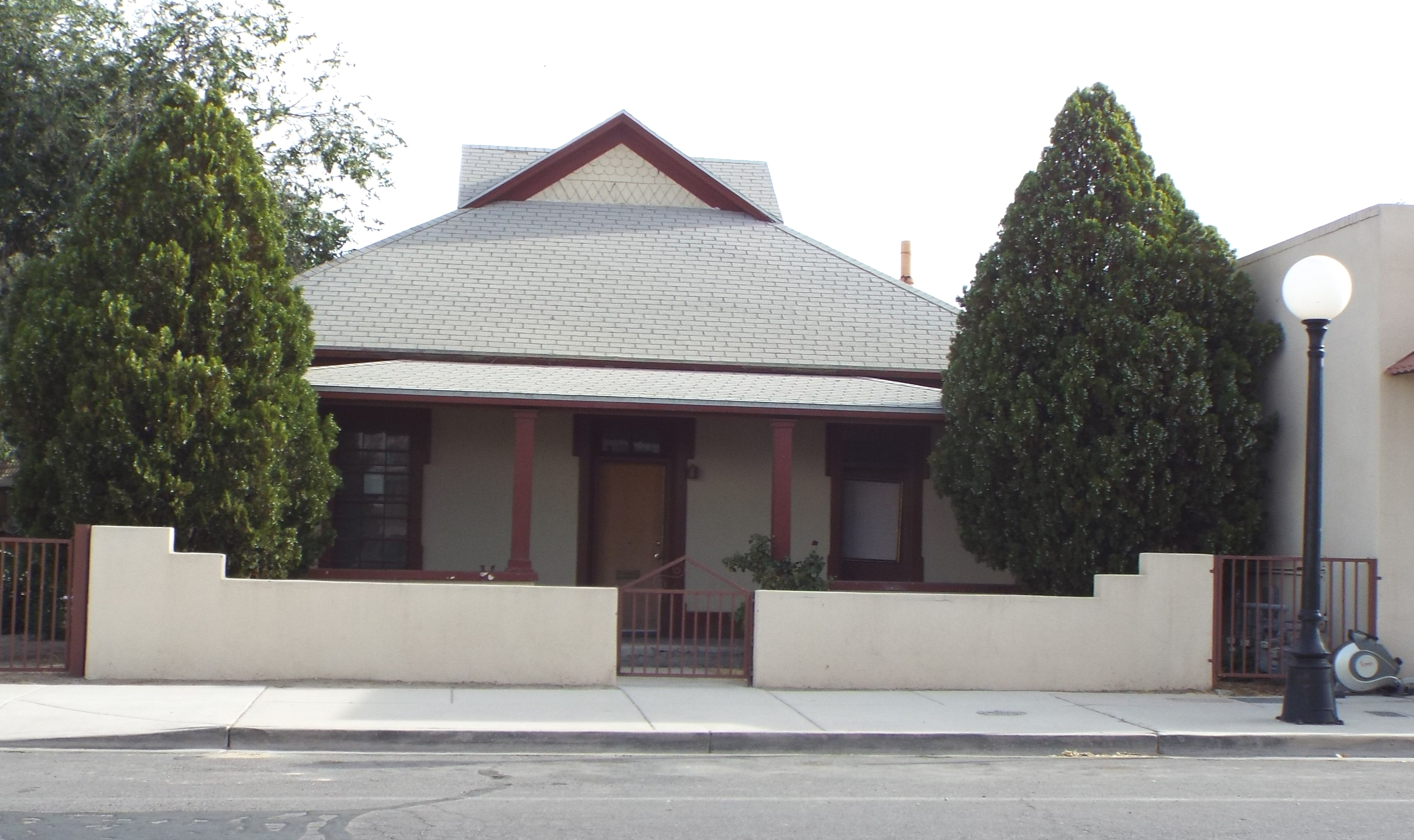
Pablo Soto House – 1880

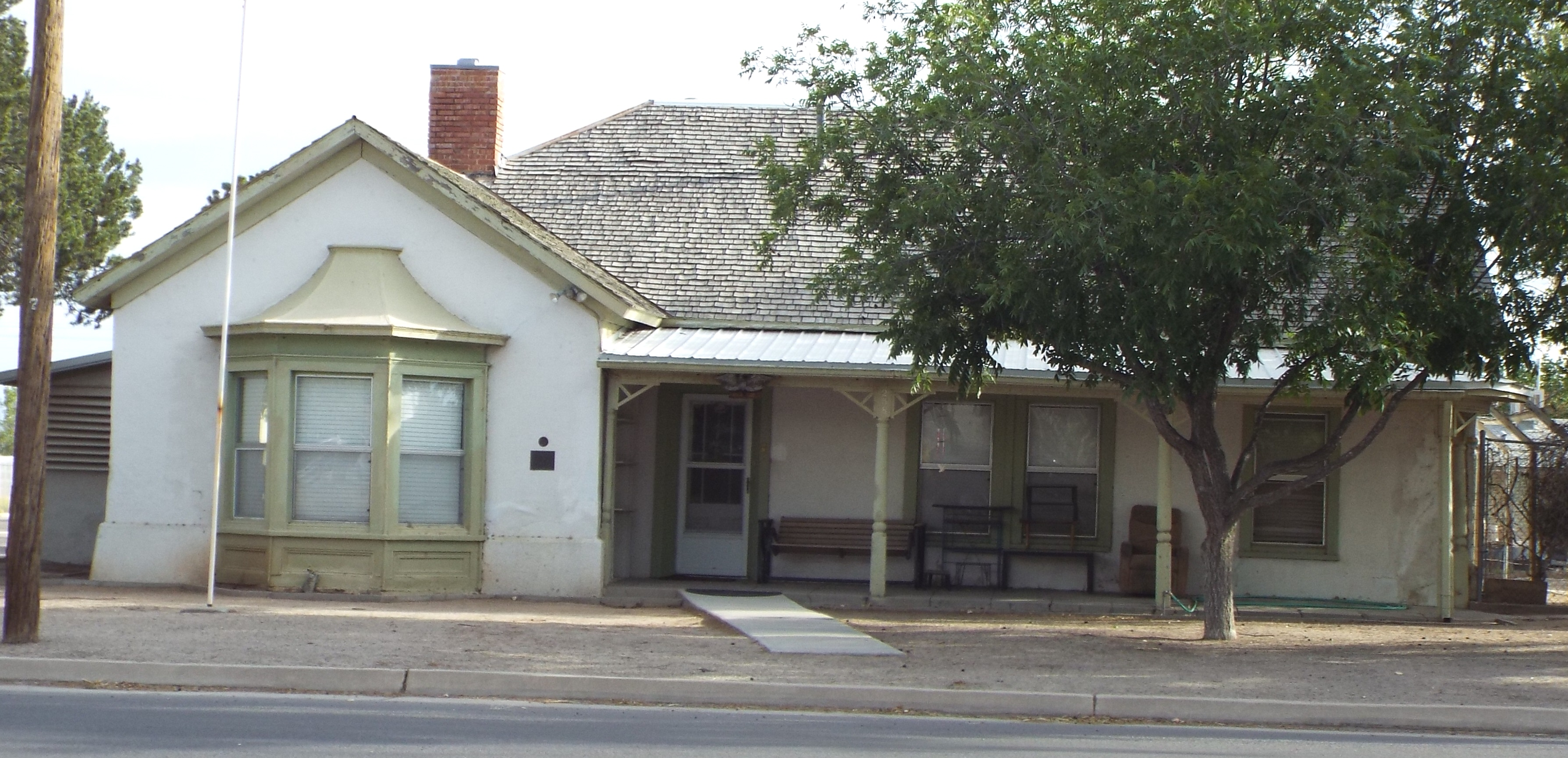
J.C. Wilson House – 1908

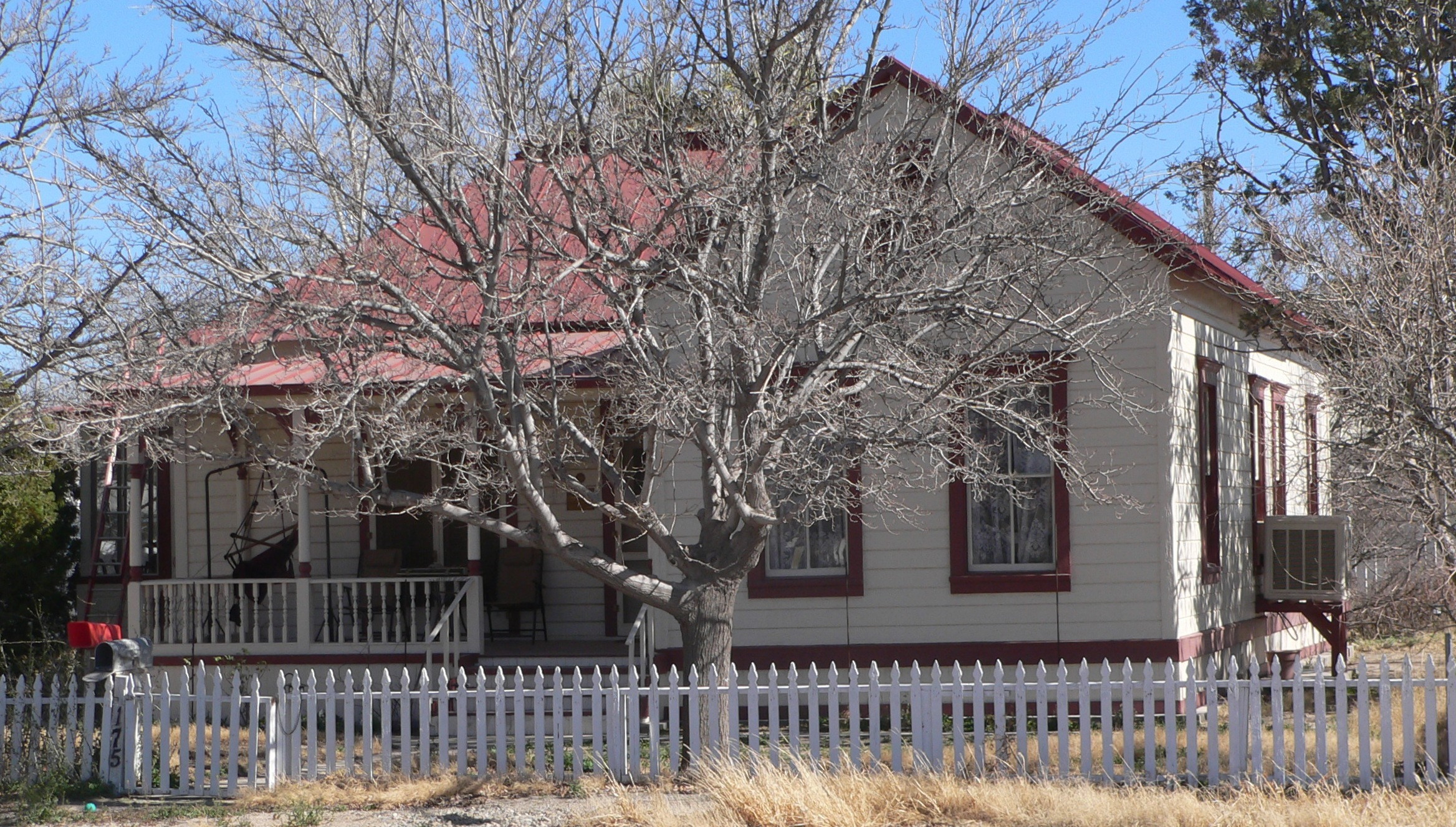
Crowley House – 1883

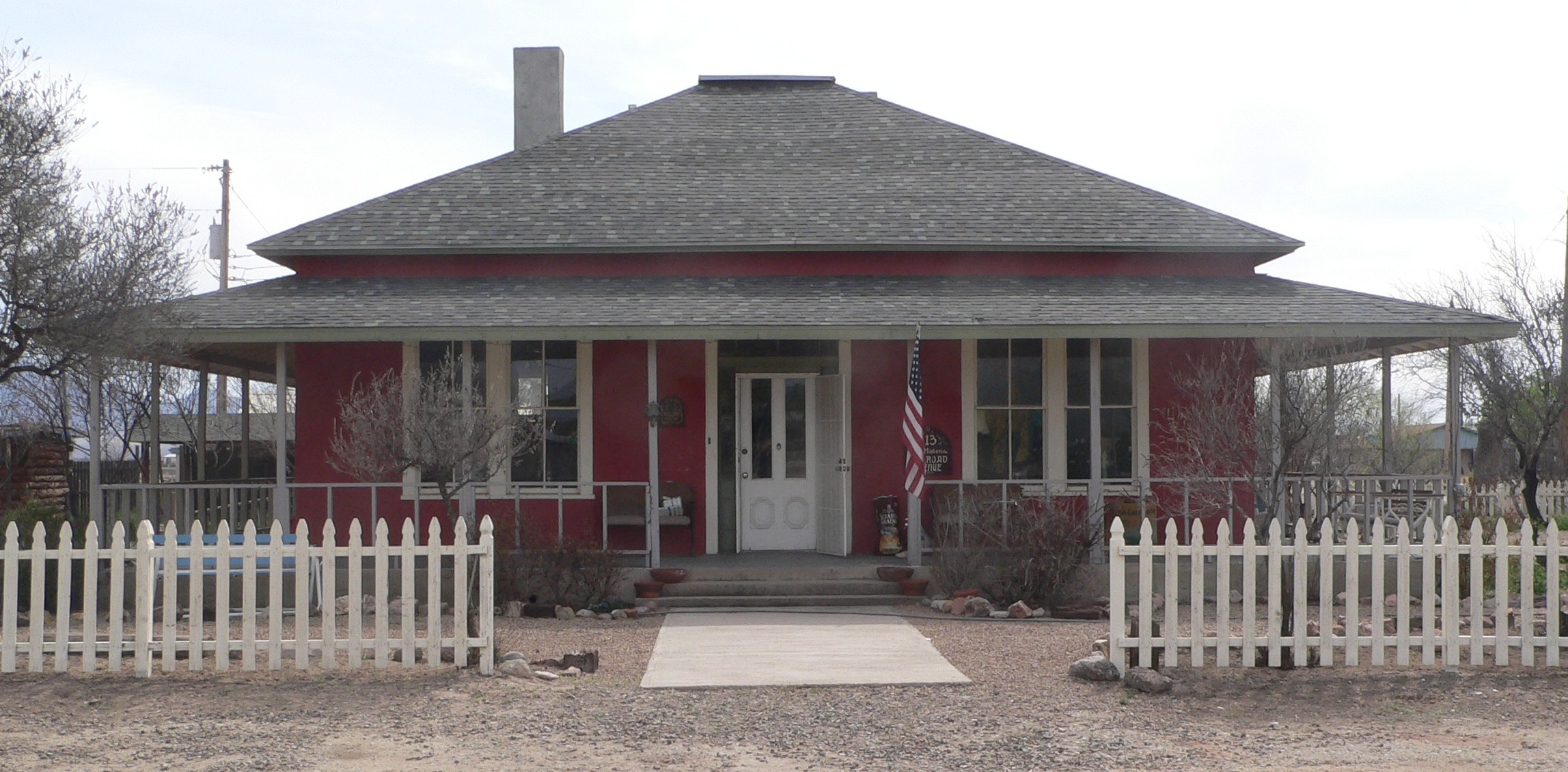
Hooker Town House – 1900

== Old City Cemetery ==
Warren Baxter Earp (youngest of the Earp brothers) and the outlaw Bill Downing are buried in the historic "Old City Cemetery". Downing's gravesite is lost because of vandalism.

Historic Old City Cemetery

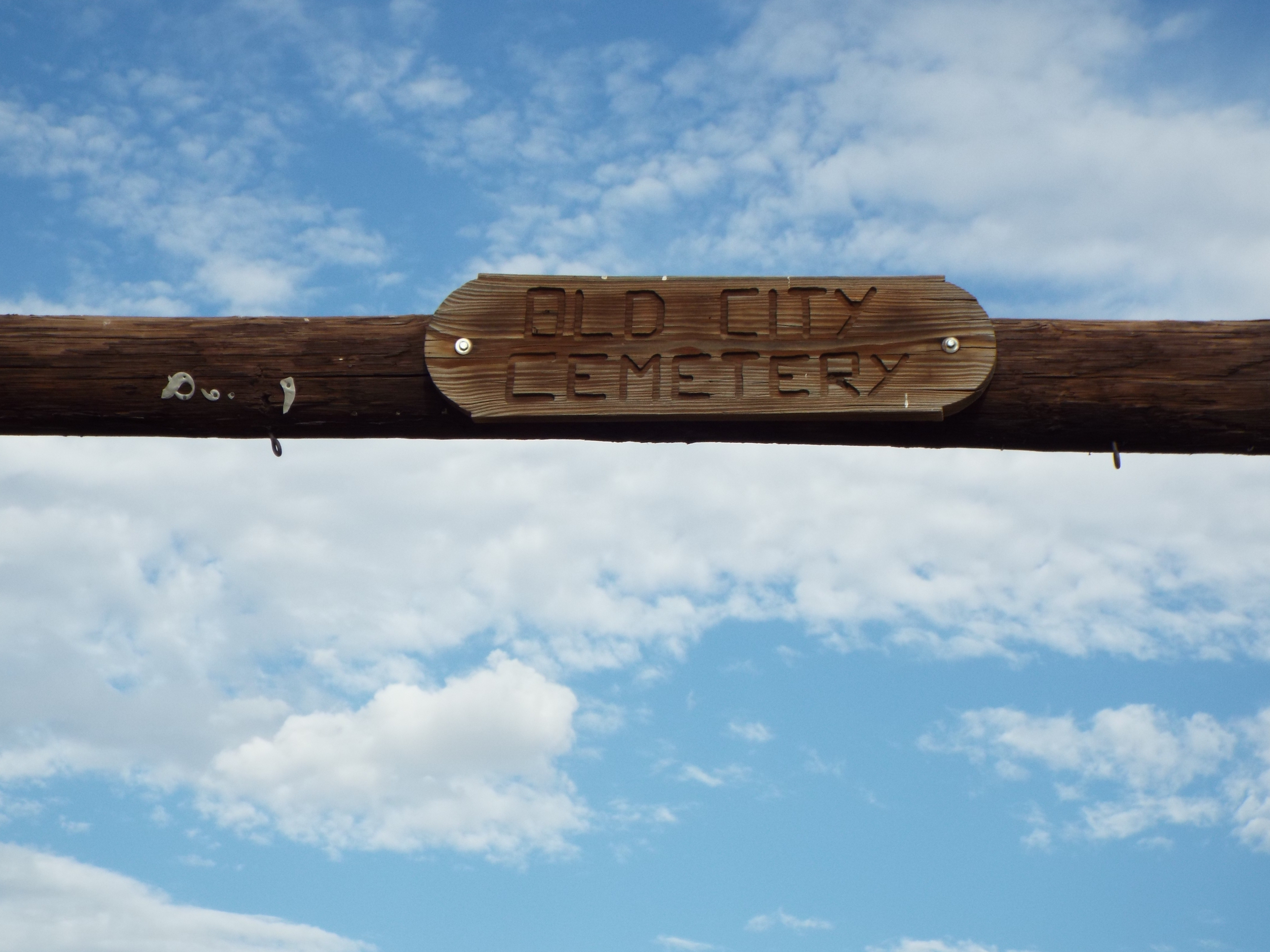
Old City Cemetery

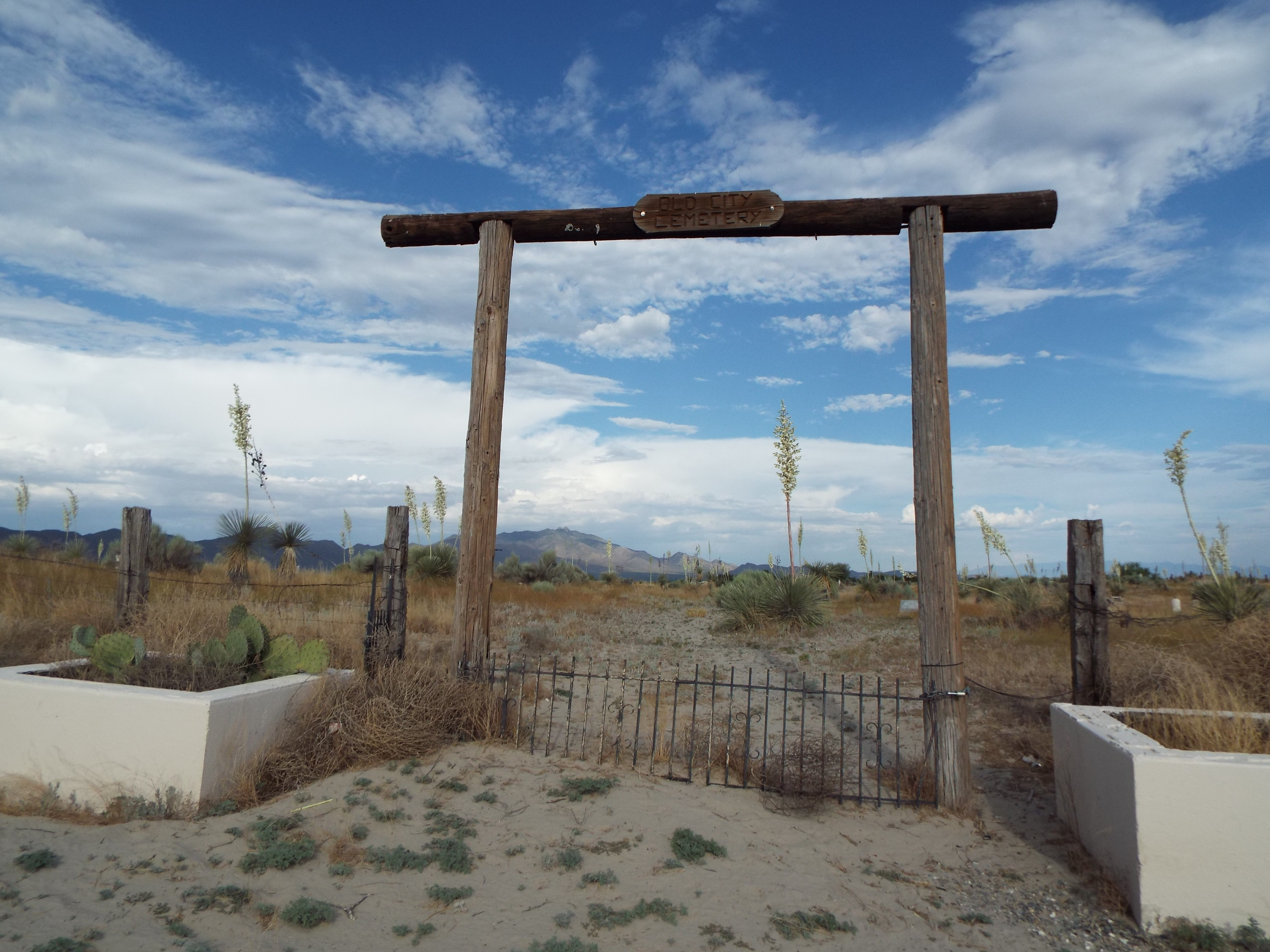
Old City Cemetery

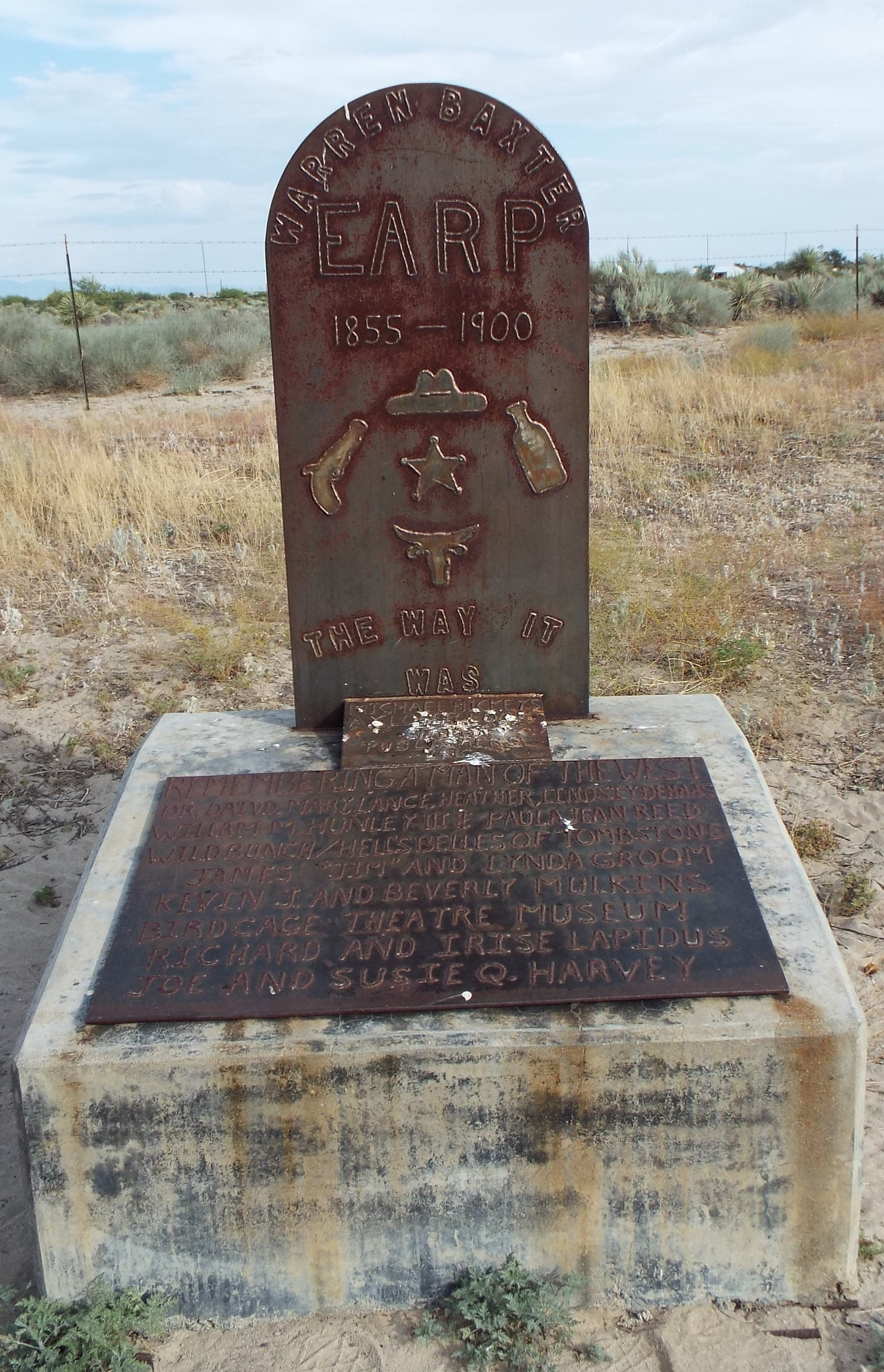
Grave of Warren Baxter Earp

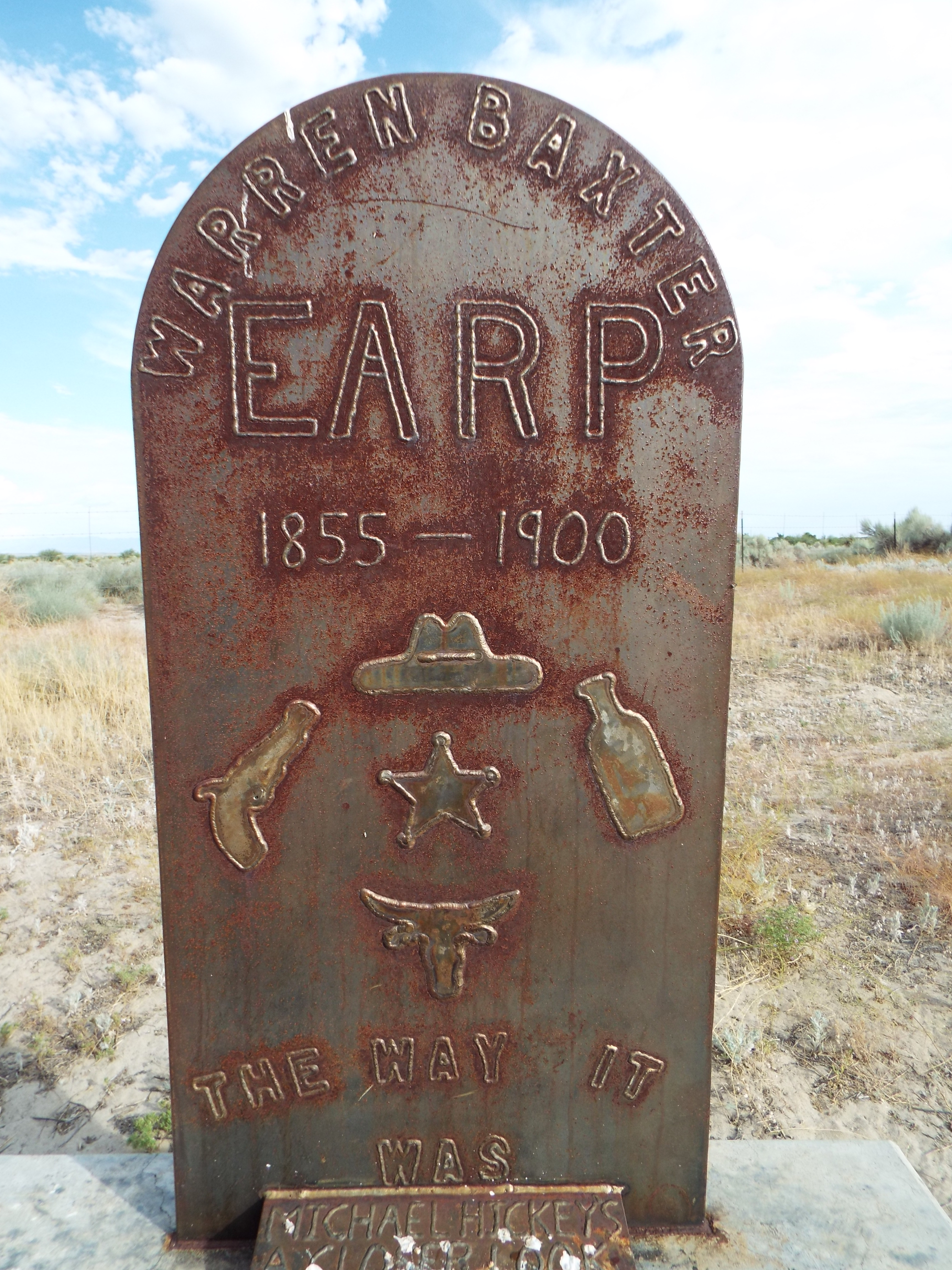
Close-up of the grave of Warren Baxter Earp

== See also ==
- National Register of Historic Places listings in Cochise County, Arizona
