= Willcox Women's Club =

- U.S. National Register of Historic Places
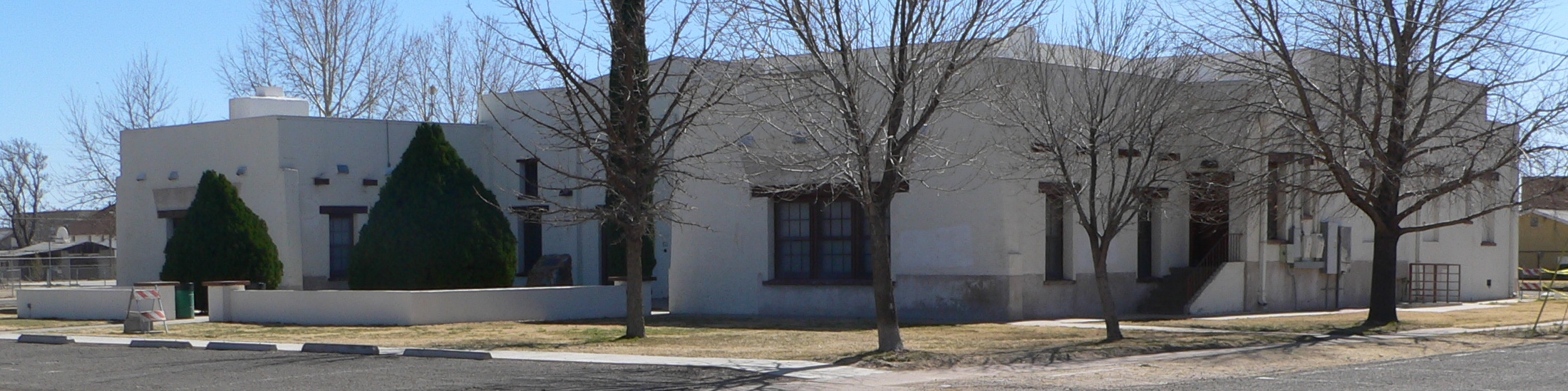

- Location within Arizona
- Location: 312 W. Stewart, Willcox, Arizona
- Coordinates: 32°15′17″N 109°50′04″W
- Area: less than one acre
- Built: 1936
- Built by: P. Howard Pregenzer
- Architectural style: Pueblo
- MPS: Willcox MRA
- NRHP reference No.: 87000740
- Added to NRHP: May 27, 1987

The Willcox Women's Club was incorporated in 1916 which allowed the club to own property. The club was a member of the Arizona State Federation of Women's Clubs. The Willcox Women's Club raised money during the 1920s to build the clubhouse, and donated land to the city in a deal for the Works Progress Administration to build the building.

== The Building ==
The Willcox Women's Club at 312 W. Stewart in Willcox, Arizona, was a W.P.A. project begun in 1934 and completed in 1936. It was listed on the National Register of Historic Places in 1987.

It was deemed significant as the only example of Pueblo Revival style in Willcox. The building is also referred to as the Willcox Women's Community Center.
