= Ja Hu Stafford =

American pioneer of Cochise County, Arizona (1834–1913)

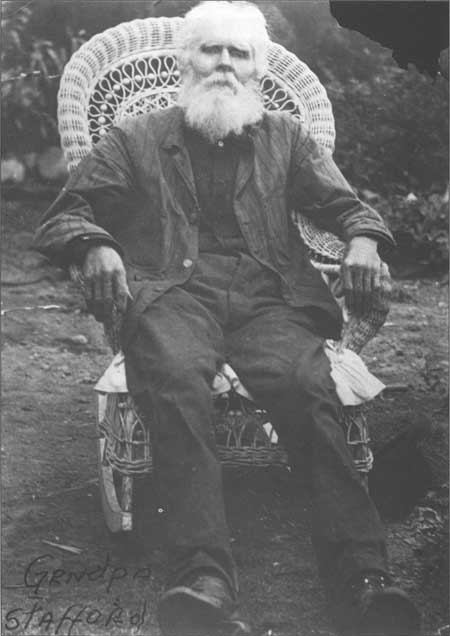
- Born: Jehu Stafford; June 2, 1834; Davidson County, North Carolina, United States
- Died: November 14, 1913 (aged 79); Cochise County, Arizona, US
- Occupations: Frontiersman, soldier, rancher, farmer
- Known for: Pioneer of Cochise County, Arizona

Ja Hu Stafford (1834–1913) was a pioneer of Cochise County, Arizona.

== Name ==
Ja Hu's name is very uncommon and was spelled in many different ways over time. Some of his descendants, many of whom still live in Cochise County, prefer to use "Jay Hugh", which was the name put on his replaced tombstone in the El Dorado Cemetery. However, the earliest known legal documents written by Stafford prove that his name was originally spelled "Jehu", after the prophet in the Hebrew Bible. Other variations of his name include "Ja Hu", which he used later in his life, "Jahu", and "J. Hugh", among others.

== Biography ==
Ja Hu Stafford was born on June 2, 1834, in Davidson County, North Carolina, to John Wesley and Clementine Reid Stafford. When Ja Hu was still a boy, his family moved to Kentucky and then to Missouri, where he lived until joining the United States Army in 1852, stating his age as twenty-one. He spent the next five years at various posts in the Indian Territory, including Forts Towson, Arbuckle and Washita, before leaving the army to travel around the country.

Ja Hu first went to Texas, then on to Arkansas and Kansas Territory, marrying his first wife Dorothy Francis Hicks, possibly in Illinois. He then drove a small herd of cattle up to Oregon and settled along the Powder River to become a rancher and farmer. After seven years of operating a saloon near Baker, Oregon, Ja Hu sold his property and went back to Kansas. In 1872, Ja Hu owned a large herd of cattle, which he sold a year later to purchase property in Garnett, Kansas. He left Garnett two years after that, but returned a short time later after continued financial difficulties. It was around this time he left his first wife, Dorothy, his daughter Alice, and his stepson Theodore to go to Colorado.

In 1879, Ja Hu was in the town of Manti, Utah, where he met a Danish-born Mormon pioneer named Christoffer Madsen. Madsen, his wife, and his two daughters first traveled west to Salt Lake City in 1867 as part of a large Mormon wagon train, consisting of about sixty covered wagons. Both of Madsen's daughters died during the journey, but a third was born in western Wyoming and named Pauline Amelia Madsen. According to family tradition, Ja Hu met the twelve-year-old Pauline in the spring of 1880, when she arrived at his cabin to get warm, after herding cattle barefoot. A few months later, on June 3, 1880, Ja Hu and Pauline were baptized into the Mormon faith in Manti and probably married at the same time. Soon after, Ja Hu and his young wife left Utah to settle in Arizona Territory.

Traveling with a small wagon train, Ja Hu arrived at Lee's Ferry on the Colorado River. Having much experience crossing rivers, he assisted the ferry operator in getting the wagon train across safely, for which he received a free crossing and one dollar in payment. In the latter half of 1880, Ja Hu arrived in the eastern part of Sulphur Springs Valley at the Riggs Ranch, established just a year or so before in what was still part of Pima County. There Ja Hu asked the owner of the ranch, Brannick Riggs, if he knew of a place he could settle nearby. Riggs suggested Bonita Canyon, to the east of the Riggs Ranch in the Chiricahua Mountains. Stafford found the area to his liking and immediately set about building a log cabin for the coming winter. The original log cabin was a small 14 square foot structure made with unpeeled logs, suggesting that it was built in a hurry. A second log room about the same size as the first was added sometime before 1885, followed by a small wooden-frame addition on the backside of the house around 1898 and a wooden-frame garage added around 1940. Ja Hu received his homestead certificate on April 6, 1886.

Ja Hu spent the remainder of his life in Bonita Canyon raising a family and tending to his ranch and farm. He was soon joined by others, including the 10th Cavalry, which established a small camp in the canyon in 1885, and the family of Neil Erickson, which settled just to the west of the Stafford Homestead in 1887. Stafford's garden was large and productive, allowing him to sell his produce to the soldiers at nearby Fort Bowie and at Camp Bonita, as well as neighboring settlers. At the time, Bonita Canyon was still wild and remote. In the earliest years, Geronimo and his band of raiders were still active in the area, and the wildlife was abundant. On one occasion, Ja Hu had to shoot and kill a male jaguar that attacked one of his horses and which measured 6 feet and 8 inches in length. Bobcats also entered his home on at least two occasions and were killed by Ja Hu with his knife. He also killed at least one black bear that was threatening his property.

An "Indian scare" occurred in Bonita Canyon in 1890, when the Apache renegade Massai and his pregnant wife traveled through the area. Massai was one of the Chiricahua prisoners that escaped the army's trains headed to Florida in 1886. He spent the rest of his life on the run in southern Arizona and northern Sonora in Mexico. One day in May 1890, Ja Hu was headed to a small corner in Bonita Canyon about three-quarters of a mile from his home that held his horses, so as to make a trip to Fort Bowie with a load of vegetables. Along the trail Ja Hu discovered a moccasin footprint. After stopping for a moment to think, Ja Hu returned to his home to protect his family. Later on, when he decided it was safe enough, he returned to his corral to find one of his horses missing. The horse, stolen by Massai, was eventually recaptured by the army and returned to Ja Hu later that year, but Massai escaped his pursuers into Mexico, after leaving his wife at the San Carlos Indian Reservation.

Ja Hu died in 1913 and was buried alongside his wife in the El Dorado Cemetery, near the Riggs Ranch. He left behind five children from his second wife, Pauline, who died in childbirth in 1894.

Ja Hu's original cabin, today known as the Stafford Cabin, is now part of the Faraway Ranch Historic District. In 1917, the owner of the neighboring Faraway Ranch, Lillian Erickson Riggs, became the owner of Stafford Cabin and incorporated it into her guest ranch business. It was later sold to the National Park Service to add to the Chiricahua National Monument. The cabin was individually listed to the National Register of Historic Places in 1975 and as part of the Faraway Ranch Historic District in 1980.

== Photo gallery ==
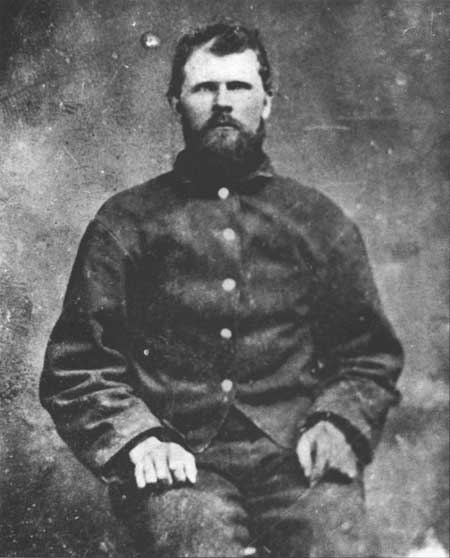
Ja Hu Stafford

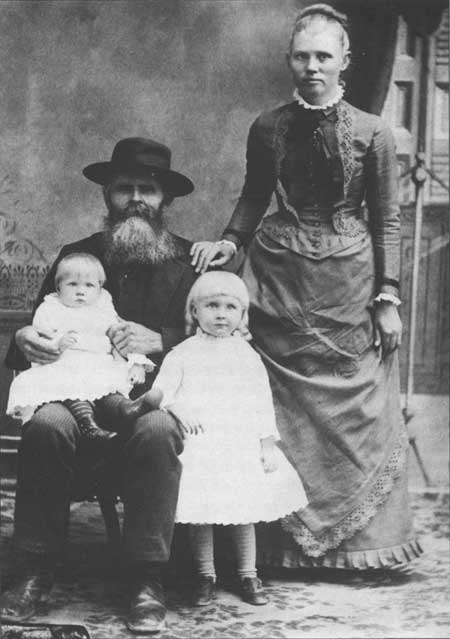
Ja Hu Stafford, his wife Pauline, and two of his daughters.

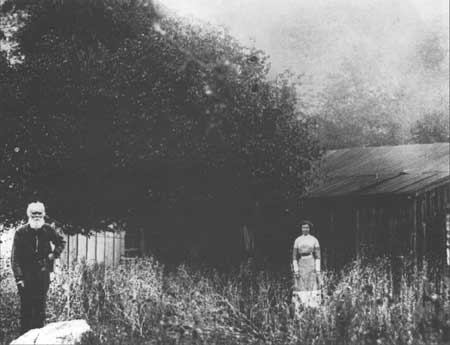
Ja Hu and his daughter Clara.

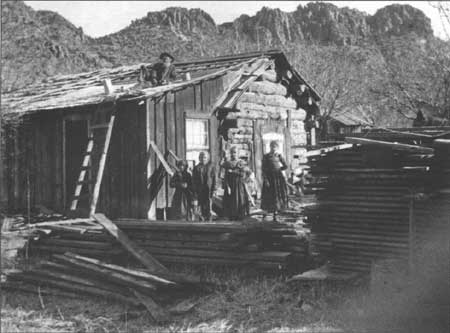
The Stafford Cabin around 1898, when a wooden-frame addition was added to the back of the cabin.

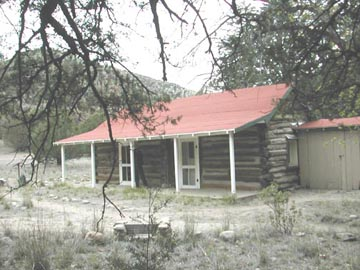
The Stafford Cabin, c.2000.

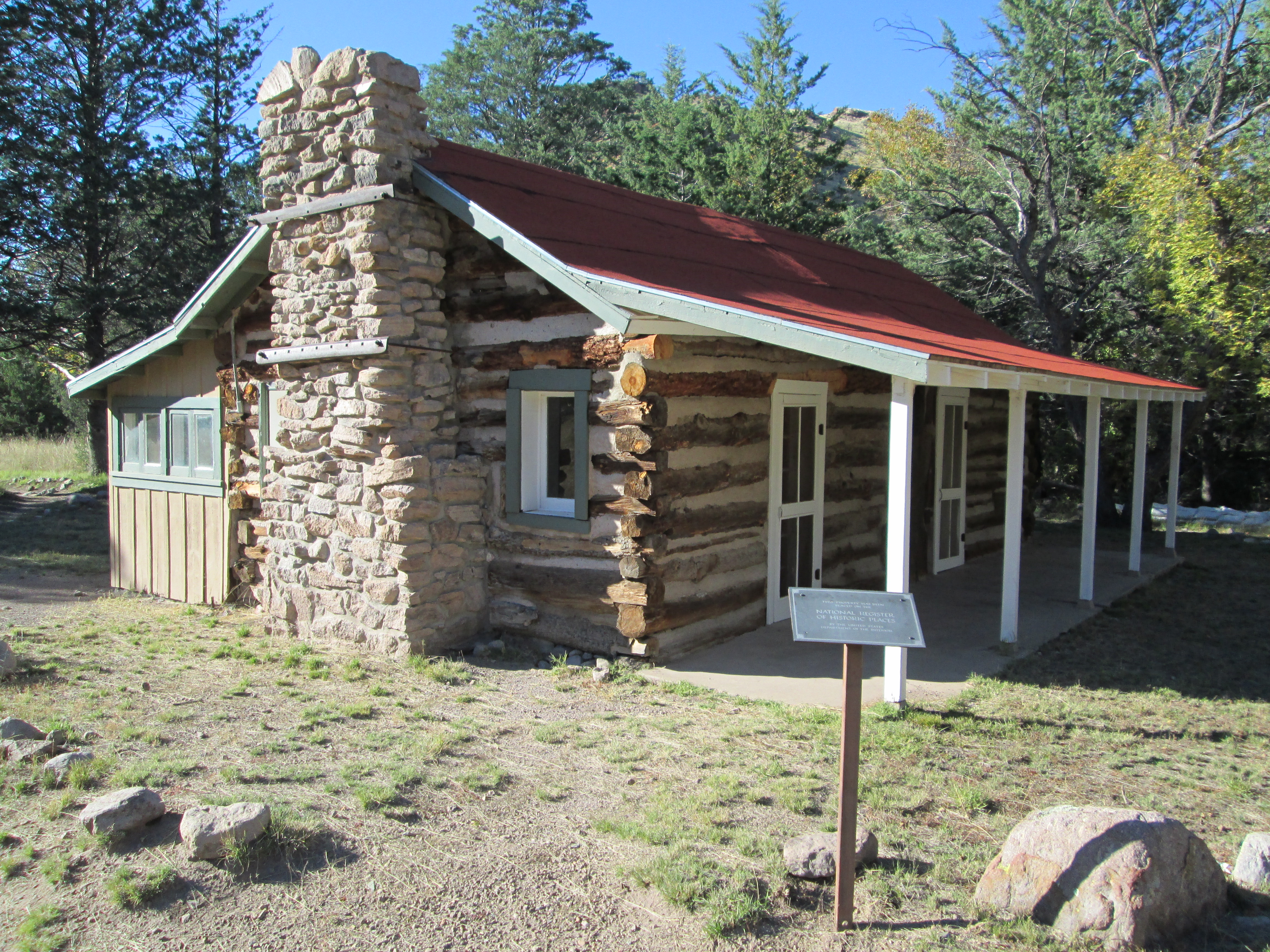
The cabin in 2014.

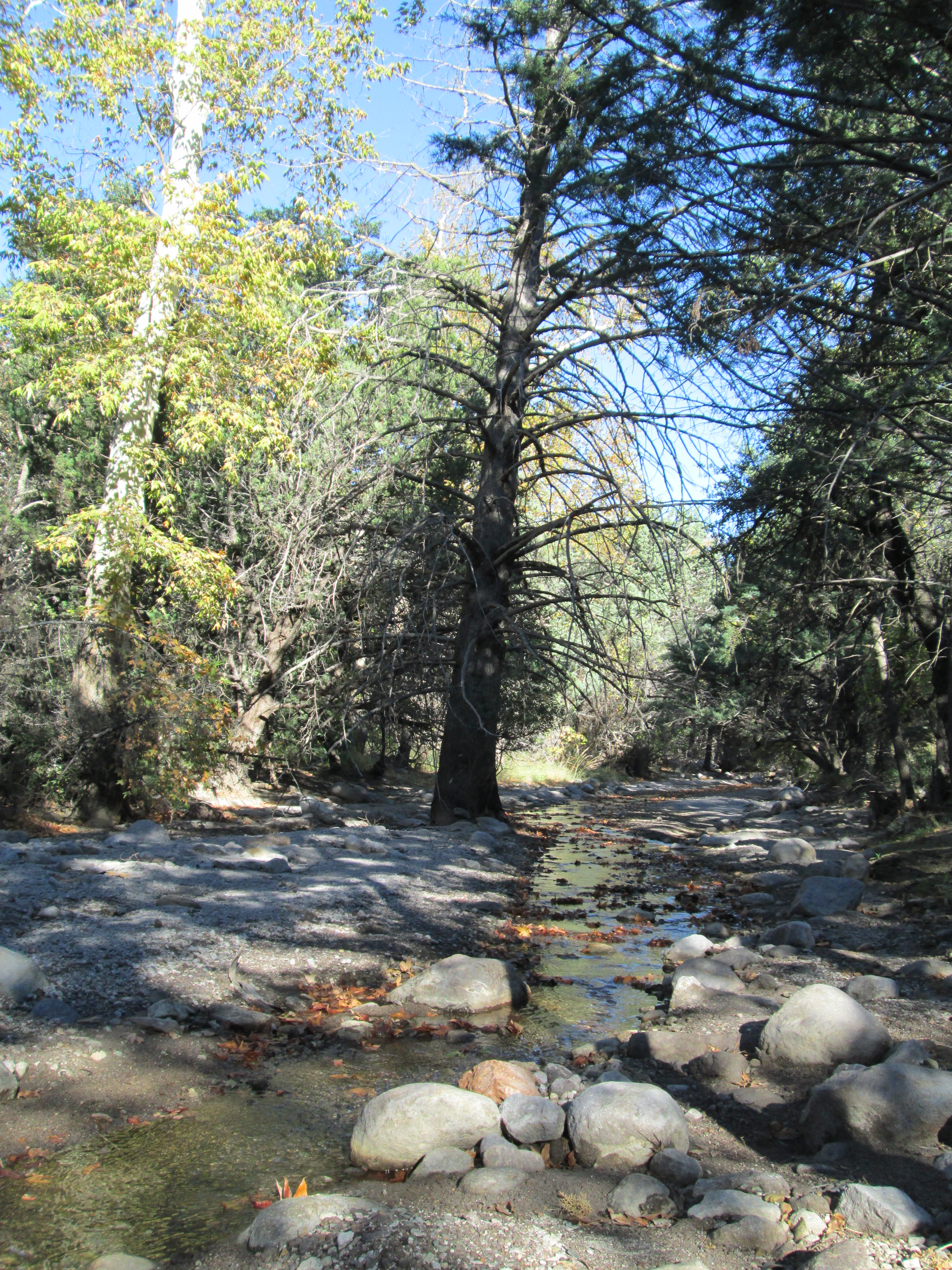
Bonita Creek, facing upstream from a point near Stafford Cabin.

== See also ==
- Faraway Ranch Historic District
- Chiricahua National Monument
