= Neil Erickson =

Arizona pioneer (1859–1937)

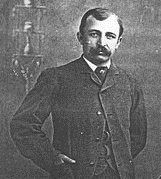
- Born: April 22, 1859; Skåne, Sweden
- Died: October 18, 1937 (aged 78); Lordsburg, New Mexico, US
- Occupations: Forest ranger, soldier, rancher, farmer, carpenter
- Known for: Pioneer of Cochise County, Arizona

Neil Erickson (April 22, 1859 – October 18, 1937) was a Swedish-born American pioneer in Cochise County, Arizona. He and the members of his family were the founders and operators of Faraway Ranch now in the Faraway Ranch Historic District of the Chiricahua National Monument in the Chiricahua Mountains in southern Arizona.

== Biography ==
Map of Faraway Ranch, Cochise County, Arizona, compiled after 1933

Neil (Nels) Erickson was born in Skåne, Sweden. In 1879, he emigrated to America, where he joined the United States Army. In the early 1880s, he traveled westward and served five years in the 4th Cavalry Regiment, battling Geronimo and his renegades. He became a sergeant and was discharged from the Army in October 1866.

He met his future wife, Emma Sophia Peterson (1854–1950), in 1883 while he was stationed at Fort Bowie. Emma was also a Swedish immigrant who was working as a maid for an army colonel. Shortly before her marriage to Erickson on January 24, 1887, Peterson purchased a log cabin from a local pioneer named Ja Hu Stafford and filed for a 160-acre homestead in Tucson, Arizona. They were married at the Cosmopolitan Hotel in Tucson. They had three children: Lillian (born 1888), Louis (born 1891) and Hildegard (born 1895).

The log cabin was located fourteen miles southeast of Fort Bowie in Bonita Canyon, a gorge in the Chiricahua Mountains. Erickson moved into the cabin first; his wife and newborn daughter, Lillian, joined him in the latter half of 1888. One of Erickson's first projects was to build a small fort to protect the homestead against Apache raids. The fort was a one-room building with thick stone walls, just a few yards from the cabin. It was never used; apart from a scare in 1890, when the Apache warrior Massai stole a horse from the Ericksons' neighbor, Stafford, there were no encounters with hostile Indians in Bonita Canyon. The fort was later incorporated into the main ranch house as a cellar.

The Ericksons had trouble raising crops and needed money to improve the ranch, so Erickson went to Bisbee to find work as a carpenter, leaving his family alone for months at a time. It wasn't until July 1903, when Erickson became the first park ranger for the new Chiricahua National Forest, that he was able to move back to the ranch. He spent about half of each year working from home and the rest at various ranger stations or the district headquarters in Paradise, on the other side of the Chiricahua Mountains.

Between 1899 and 1915, Erickson and his family built a two-and-a-half-story ranch house with adobe and board-and-batten walls to replace their original log cabin. Two years after the house was completed, in 1917, the Forest Service transferred him to Flagstaff, in northern Arizona. At that time, Erickson and his wife moved out leaving their daughters in charge of the ranch.

Their daughters Hildegard and Lillian soon made major improvements by adding additional land and buildings to their holdings. In 1917, Hildegard, began boarding guests at the ranch on weekends and Lillian soon gave up teaching to help with the business. After Hildegard married in 1920, Lillian continued to run the operation as a guest ranch called the Faraway Ranch. Lillian Erickson Riggs and her husband Edward Murray Riggs (1885–1950), whom she married in 1923, managed the Faraway Ranch guest operations into the mid-1960s, with Lillian managing the ranch until her death in 1977.

Erickson remained in Flagstaff with his wife until his retirement in 1927, at which point they moved back to Faraway Ranch. They lived there for the rest of their lives, helping to improve the property and manage their daughter's guest ranch business. Erickson died in 1937 at age 78.

Their former ranch house survives and is now the centerpiece of the Faraway Ranch Historic District in the Chiricahua National Monument.

== Gallery ==
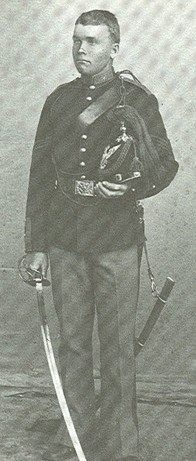
Neil Erickson in the 4th Cavalry Regiment in the 1880s.

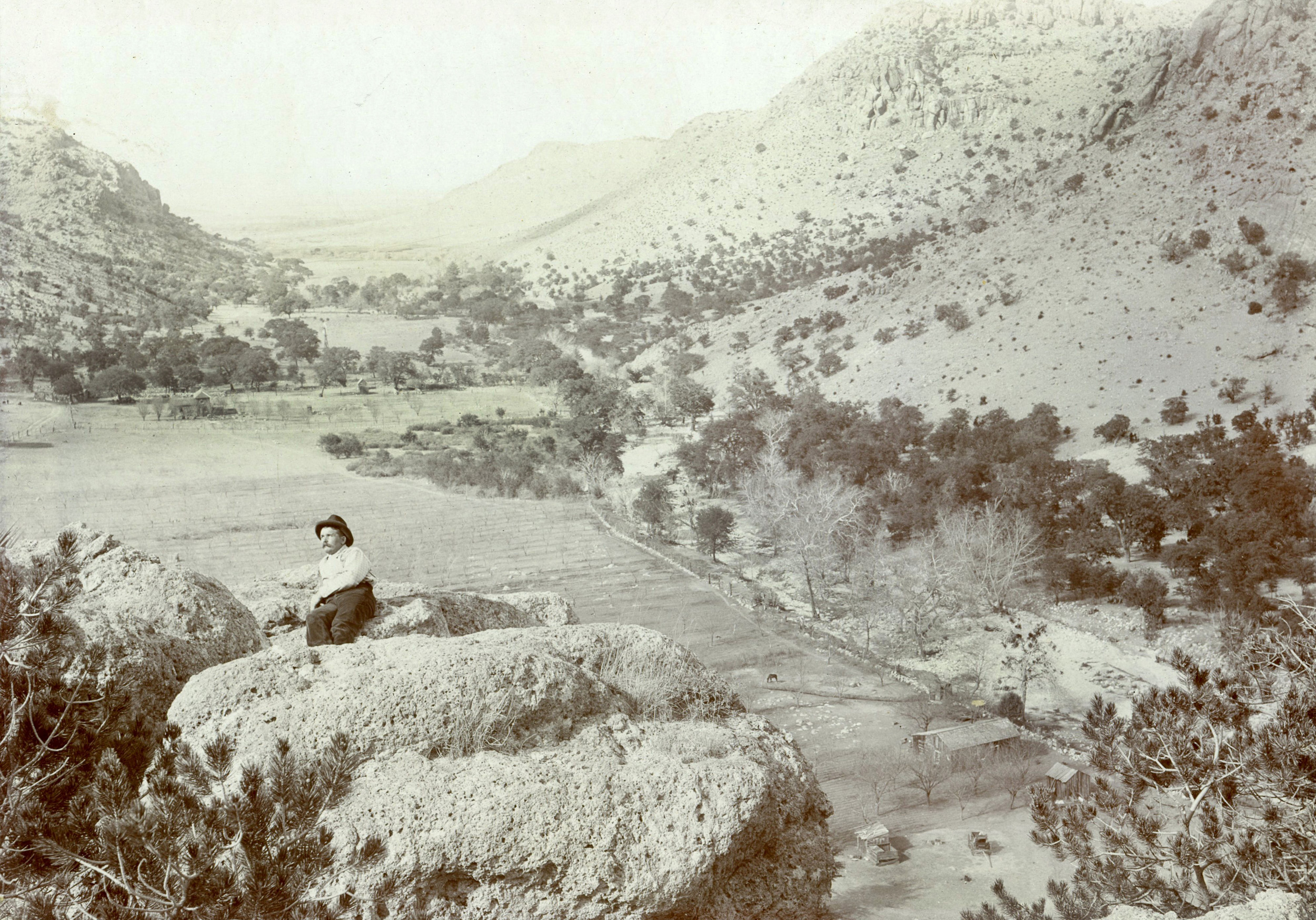
Erickson on top of a rock formation in Bonita Canyon, overlooking his homestead.

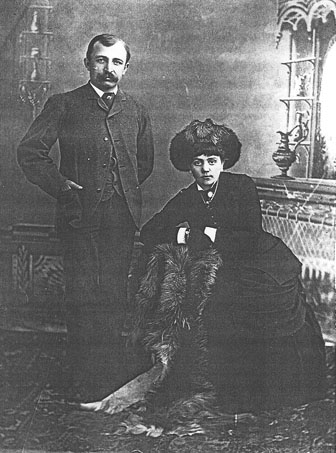
Neil and Emma Erickson, circa 1900.

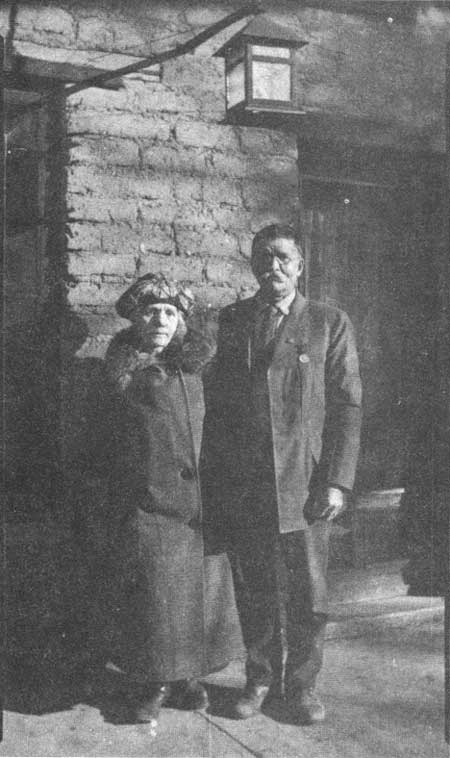
Neil and Emma Erickson after his retirement from the Forest Service in 1927.

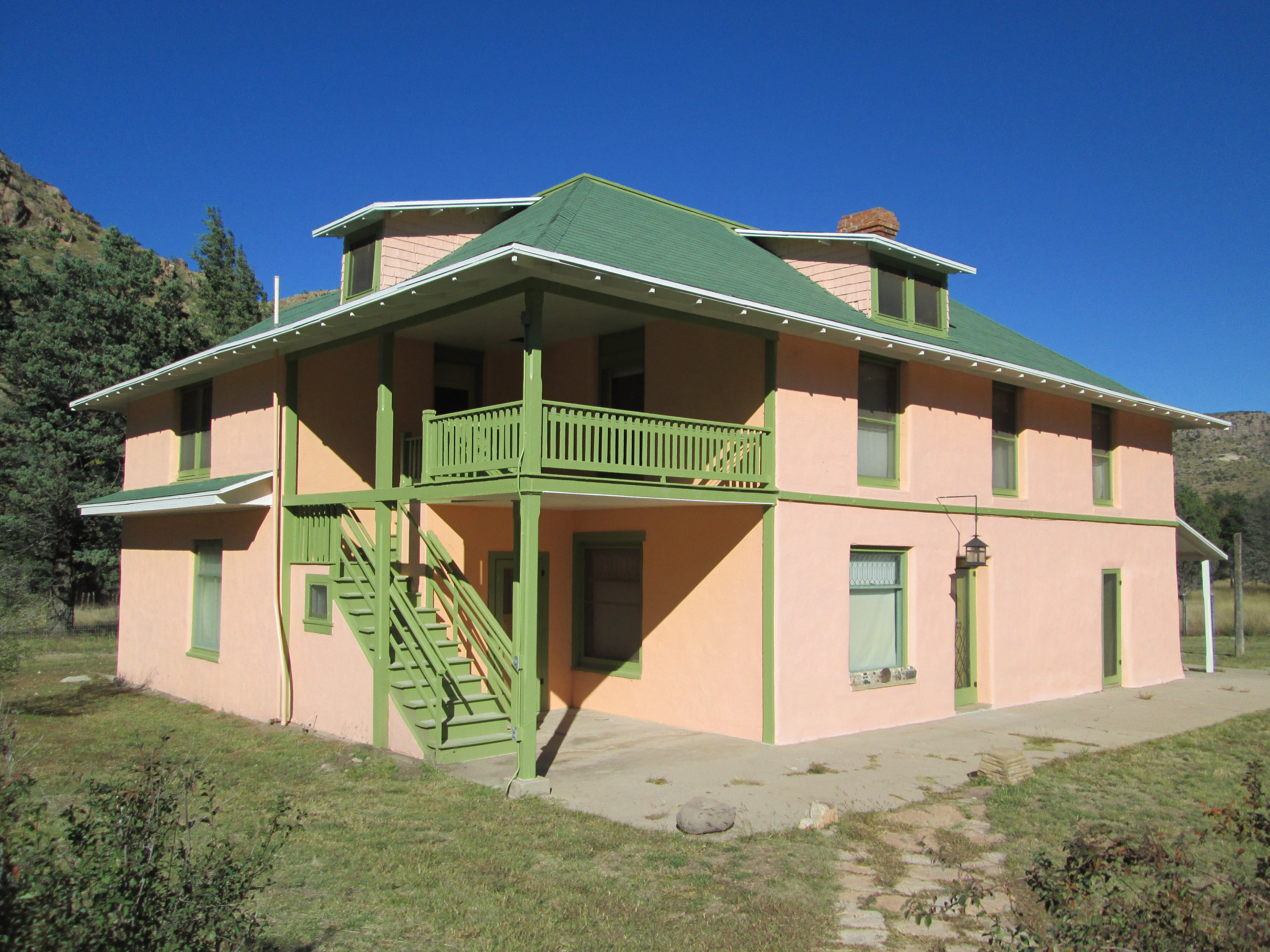
Faraway Ranch House in 2014.

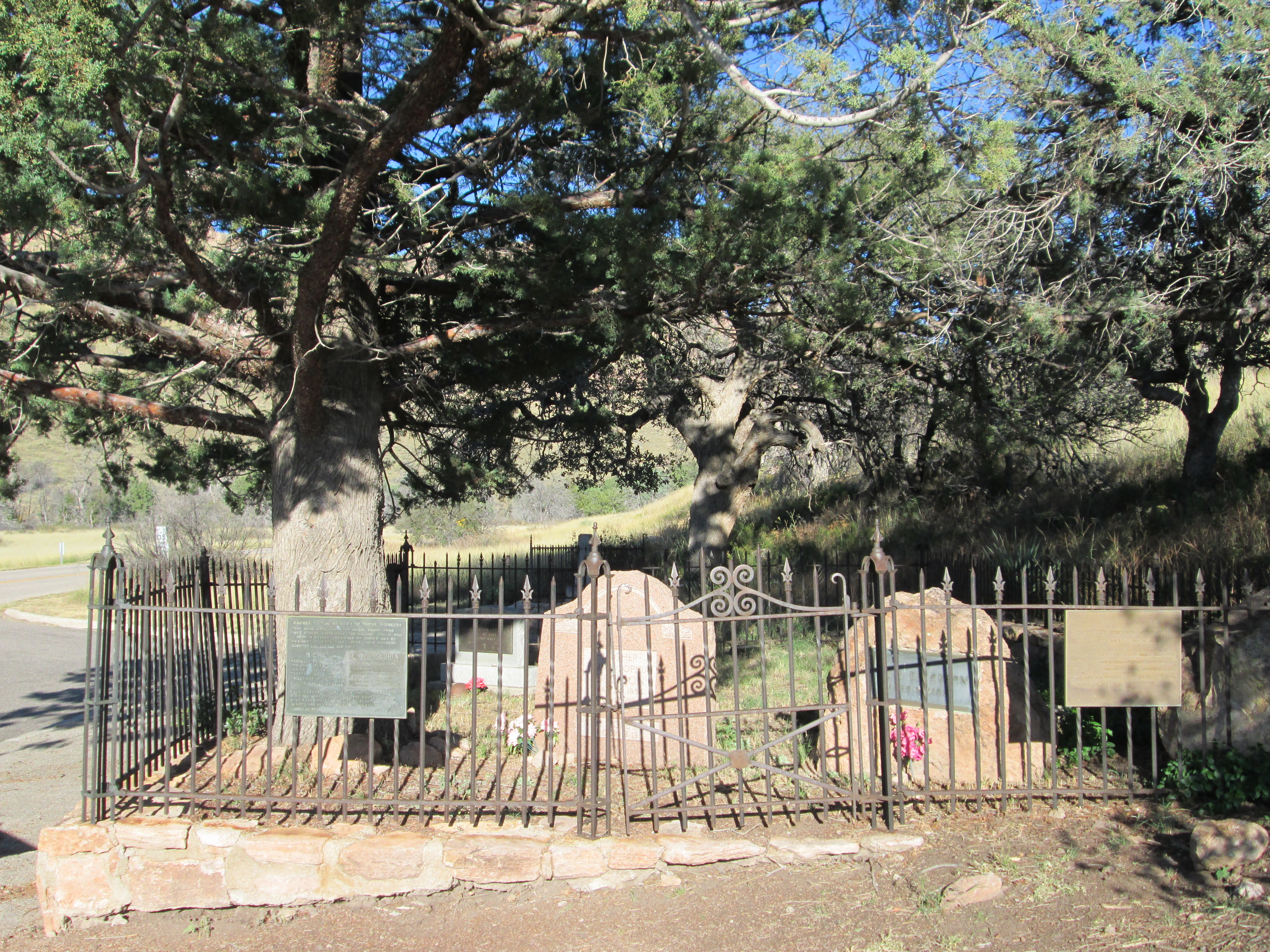
Faraway Ranch Cemetery, where the Ericksons are buried.

== See also ==
- Faraway Ranch Historic District

== Other sources ==
- Ascarza, William (2014) Chiricahua Mountains: History and Nature (The History Press) ISBN 9781609498009
- Nilsson, Birgitta (1996) Long Ago and Far Away ( Prairie Publishing)
- Steele, A. T. (1958) The Lady Boss of Faraway Ranch (Saturday Evening Post)
- Wegman-French, Elizabeth (2006) Faraway Ranch Special History Study, Chiricahua National Monument (National Park Service, U.S. Department of the Interior)
