= Faraway Ranch Historic District =

Historic district in Arizona, United States

- U.S. National Register of Historic Places
- U.S. Historic district
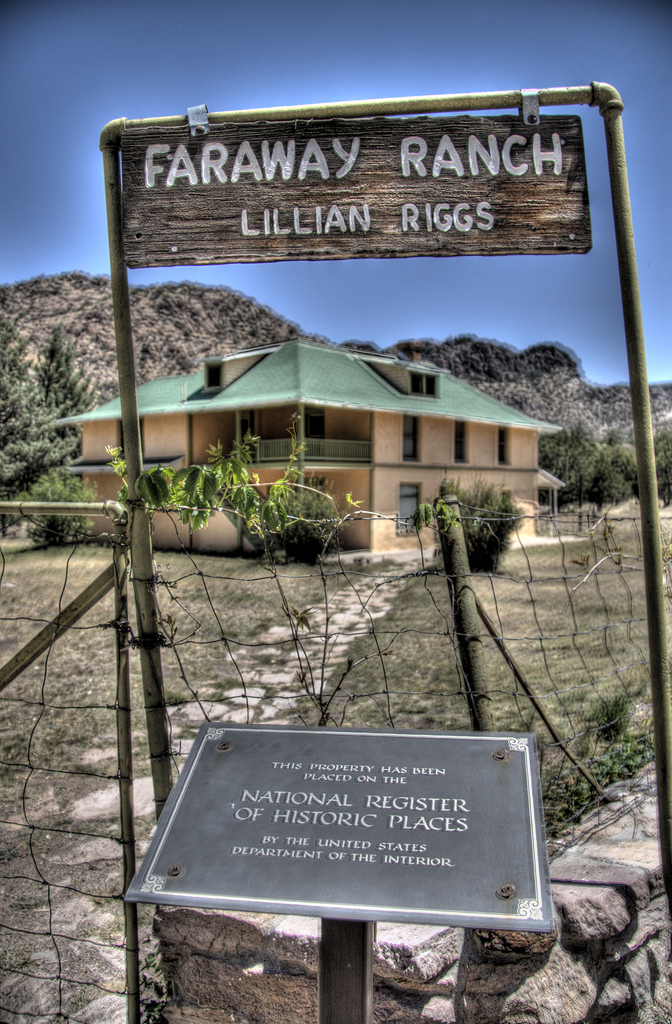

- Location within Arizona Location within the United States
- Location: Cochise County, Arizona, USA
- Nearest city: Willcox, Arizona
- Coordinates: 32°0′38″N 109°22′23″W
- Built: 1887
- NRHP reference No.: 80000368
- Added to NRHP: August 27, 1980

The Faraway Ranch Historic District is part of the Chiricahua National Park in southeastern Arizona, and preserves an area associated with the final conflicts with the local Apache, one of the last frontier settlements, and in particular, its association with the people who promoted the establishment of the Chiricahua National Monument. Faraway Ranch is located in Bonita Canyon, which lies at an approximate altitude of 5160 feet and opens in a southwesterly direction into the Sulphur Springs Valley.

== History ==
=== 19th century ===
Settlement of the area was started at the Stafford Homestead in Bonita Canyon in 1879. Ja Hu Stafford was a significant pioneer in the area, and his cabin was incorporated into the later tourist development. In 1885–86, the 10th Cavalry, an African-American enlisted unit commanded by white officers, established a temporary camp at Bonita Canyon. They were part of the last campaign to capture the Apache warrior Geronimo.

In 1886 Neil Erickson and Emma Sophia Peterson, both young Swedish immigrants, married and set out for Bonita Canyon to homestead. The Erickson Homestead, established in 1887, soon became the Erickson Ranch as they gradually took over the smaller homesteads in the canyon. They planted fruit trees and vegetables, and raised cattle. The Erickson Ranch period, 1887–1917, was significant in the areas of agriculture, architecture, industry, social history, conservation and the end of the frontier.

=== 20th century ===
In 1903 Neil became a forest ranger with what soon became the United States Forest Service. He was promoted to District Ranger in 1917. He headquartered at the ranch until he received his promotion which required him to relocate. The senior Ericksons left the ranch in the hands of their oldest child, Lillian, a college graduate and part-time school teacher. She managed the cattle ranching operations and branched out into guest ranching, letting rooms, and providing guests with horses to ride and guided trail tours for a fee. In 1923 she suffered a head injury in a fall from a horse which compromised her vision immediately and took it completely 19 years later. Nevertheless, even into her 80s she continued to run the ranch with the help of series of foremen and hired hands. Guest operations continued into the mid-1960s. In 1974 she moved for a time to a rest home in Willcox, but returned to the ranch and continued to manage it in some capacity until her death in 1977.

Chiricahua National Park

At about the same time as her accident, 1923, Lillian married a local son of pioneer stock, Ed Riggs. While she managed the operations at home, Ed promoted the "Wonderland of Rocks," an area of rhyolite tuff rock formations just southeast of the ranch) as a tourist attraction and potential national monument. Largely through his efforts, Chiricahua National Monument was established in 1924 and Riggs was hired to supervise construction of new horse and hiking trails throughout the newly established monument. He also managed most of the maintenance around the ranch until his death in 1950. In 2026, the Monument was redesignated as a National Park.

The National Park Service acquired furnishings, papers, documents and records associated with the ranch with its purchase.

== Buildings ==
The existing buildings at the Faraway Ranch have been restored to resemble their early 20th-century appearances. These buildings include:

- Ranch House: Adobe and board-and-batten structure with a hipped roof and finished in mineral composition shingles over earlier wood shingles. It is nearly square in plan, with exterior walls principally of adobe bricks plastered over both inside and out, with open porches filling its southwest corner on both floors. Additionally, a screened, shed-roofed porch has been added along the ground floor on the east side, and a glazed, shed-roofed porch constituting the guest dining room has been added along most of the north side.
- Office/small garage: Small frame building with tin roof painted green, originally used by Neil Erickson as an office and a personal garage, now used as an exhibit building
- Large garage: Frame structure with five stalls, large sliding doors, and a tin gable roof, built for guests
- Large shed: Frame structure with a tin gable roof, attached on one side to the large garage
- Stafford Cabin: Log cabin with two frame additions, one of which is a small garage
- Cowboy House: Wooden L-shaped structure with shallow-pitched gable roof, originally two separate cabins that were joined, used by cowboys and later by guests
- Bunkhouse: Cabin with stone and board-and-batten walls and a roof finished with brown composition shingles, originally used as three separate guest quarters
- Martha Riggs House: Wooden structure that burned down in 1963, only concrete foundation remains. The building was purchased by the Ericksons and moved from an unspecified location to the Faraway Ranch as an additional guests quarters.
- Barn: Frame structure with tin gable roof, includes saddle house and feed room
- Corral: Typical horse corral with wooden fencing
- Generator house: Stone building with a tin gable roof, used to house a gasoline-powered generator, now missing
- Storage shed: Frame structure with a tin gable roof
- Tool shed: Frame structure with a tin shed roof

== Photo gallery ==
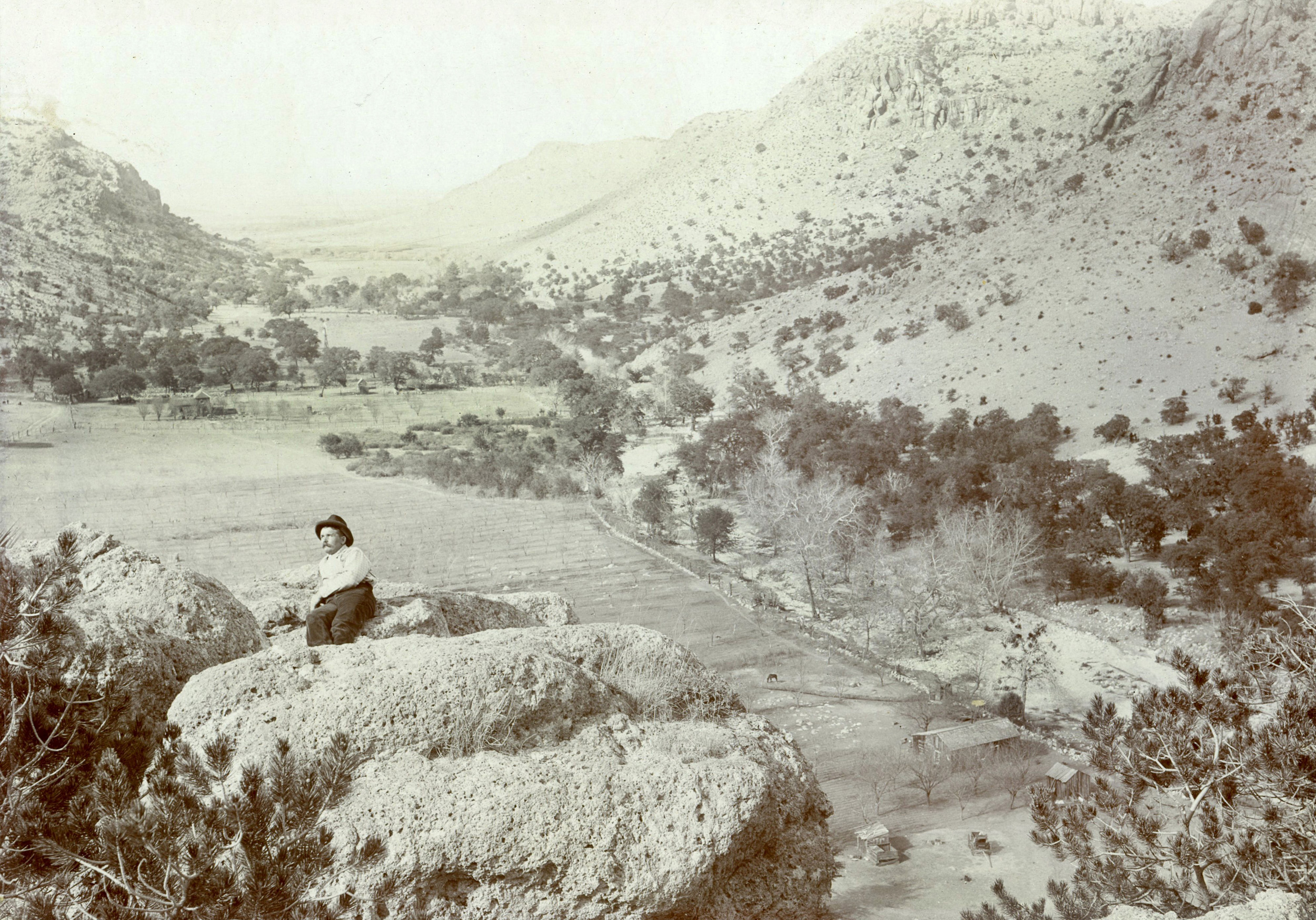
Neil Erickson relaxing on top of a rock formation overlooking his homestead in Bonita Canyon.

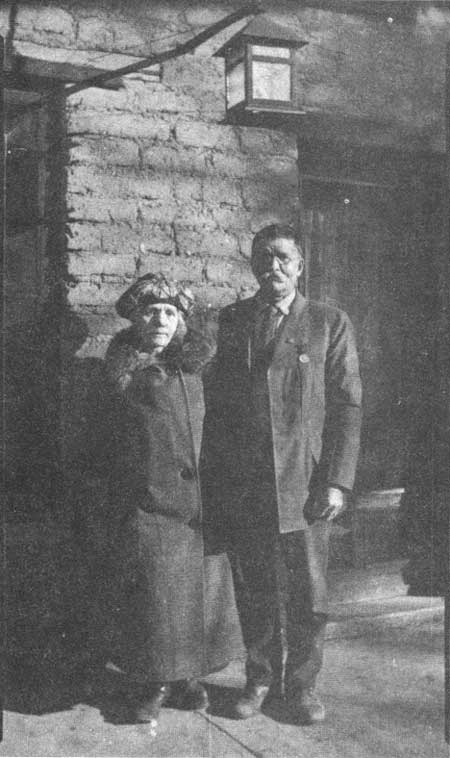
Neil Erickson and his wife, Emma, in front of the Faraway Ranch House in 1927.

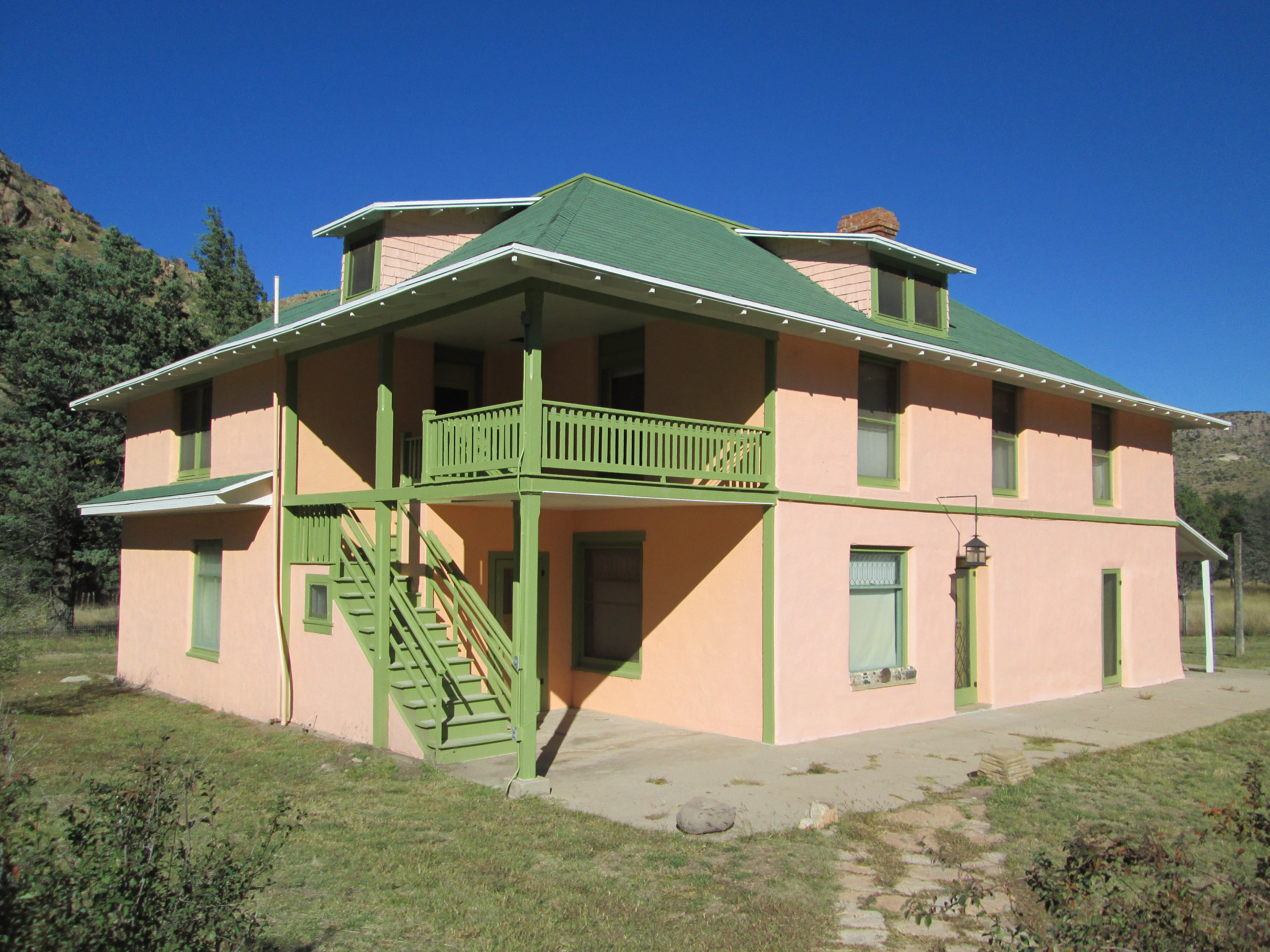
Faraway Ranch House

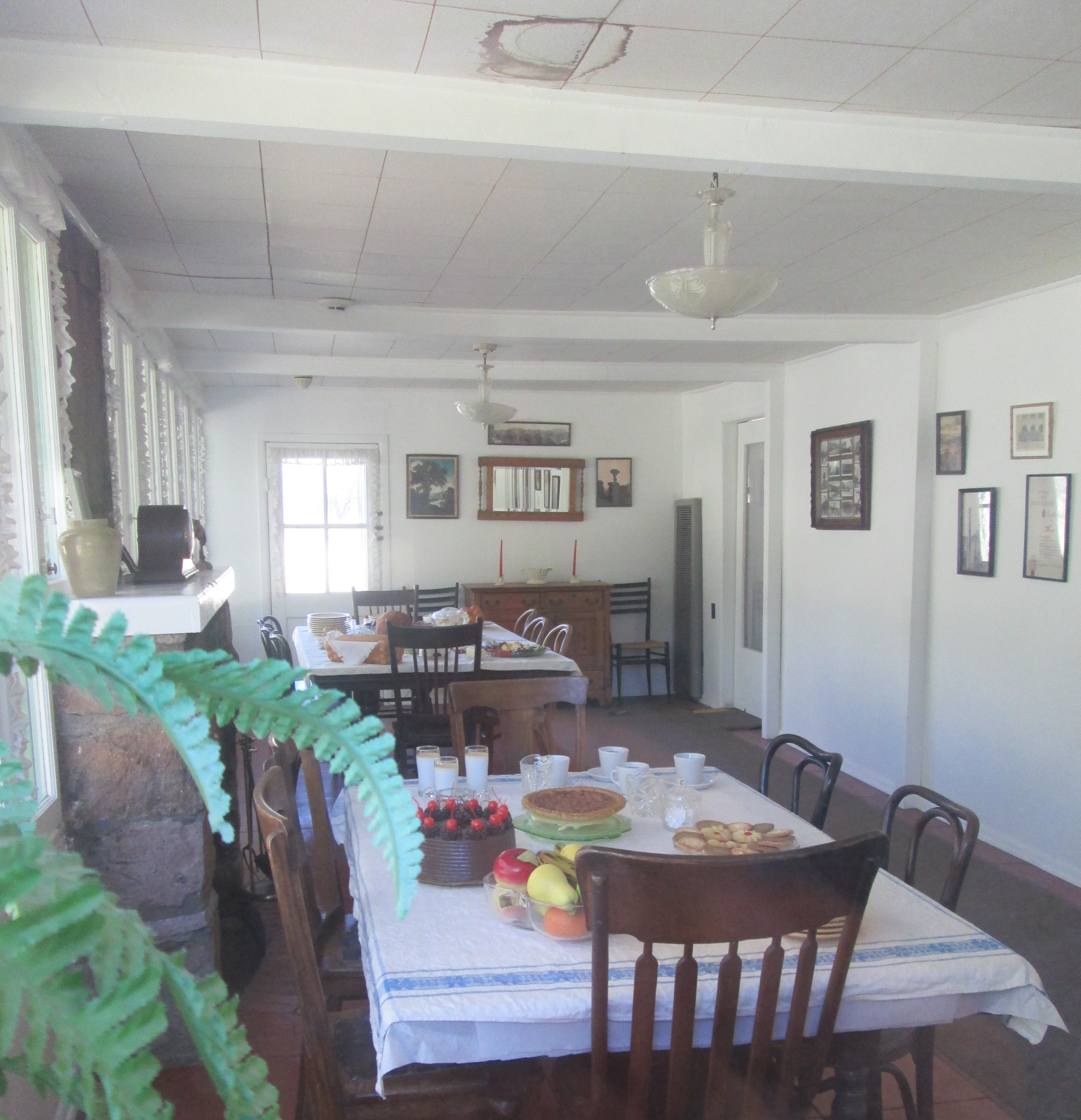
The dining room, built in the 1920s.

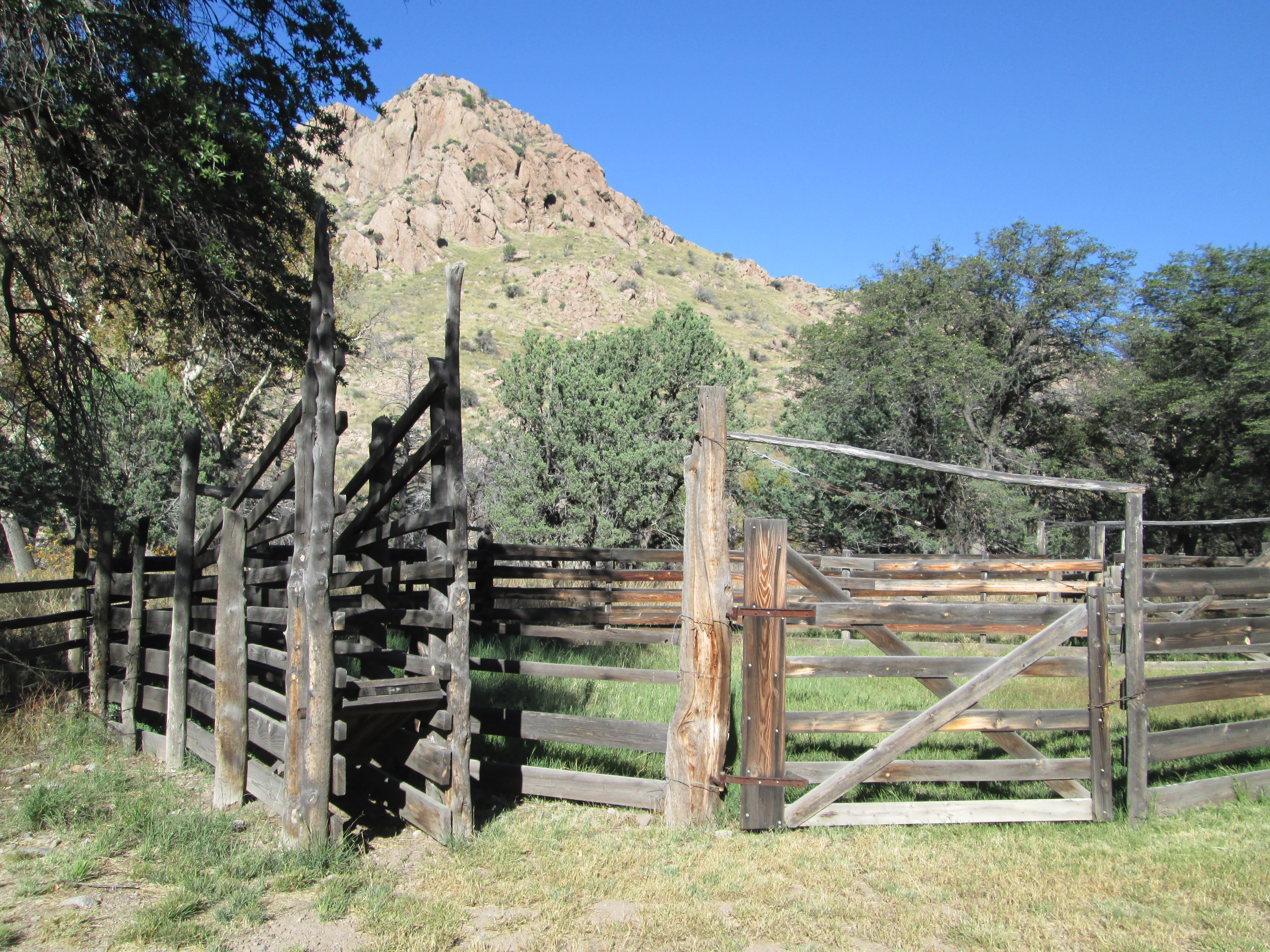
The horse corral.

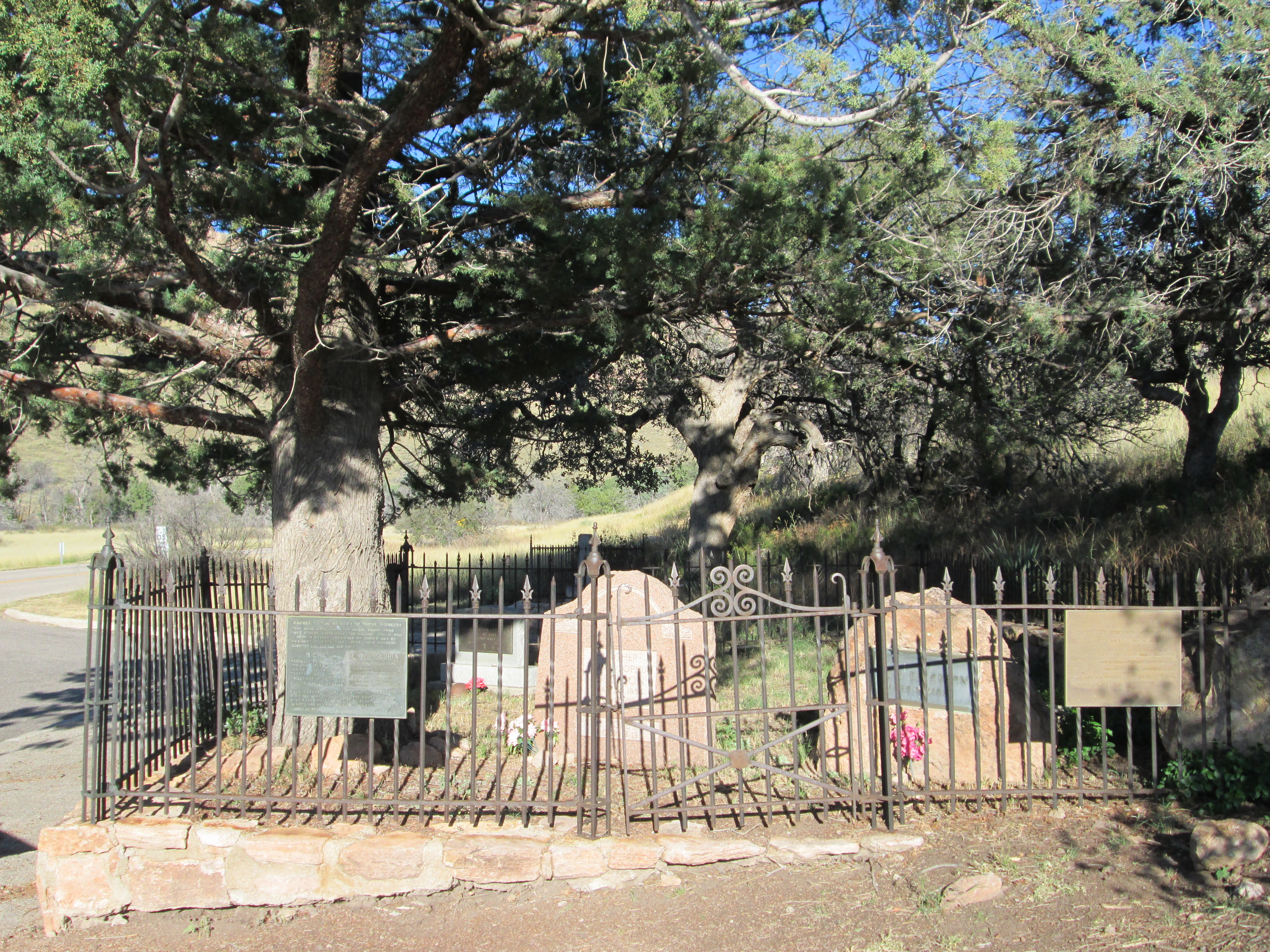
Faraway Ranch Cemetery, where the Ericksons are buried.

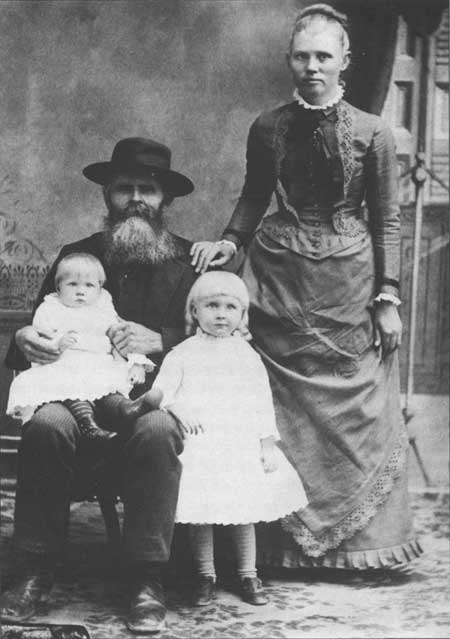
Ja Hu Stafford and family.

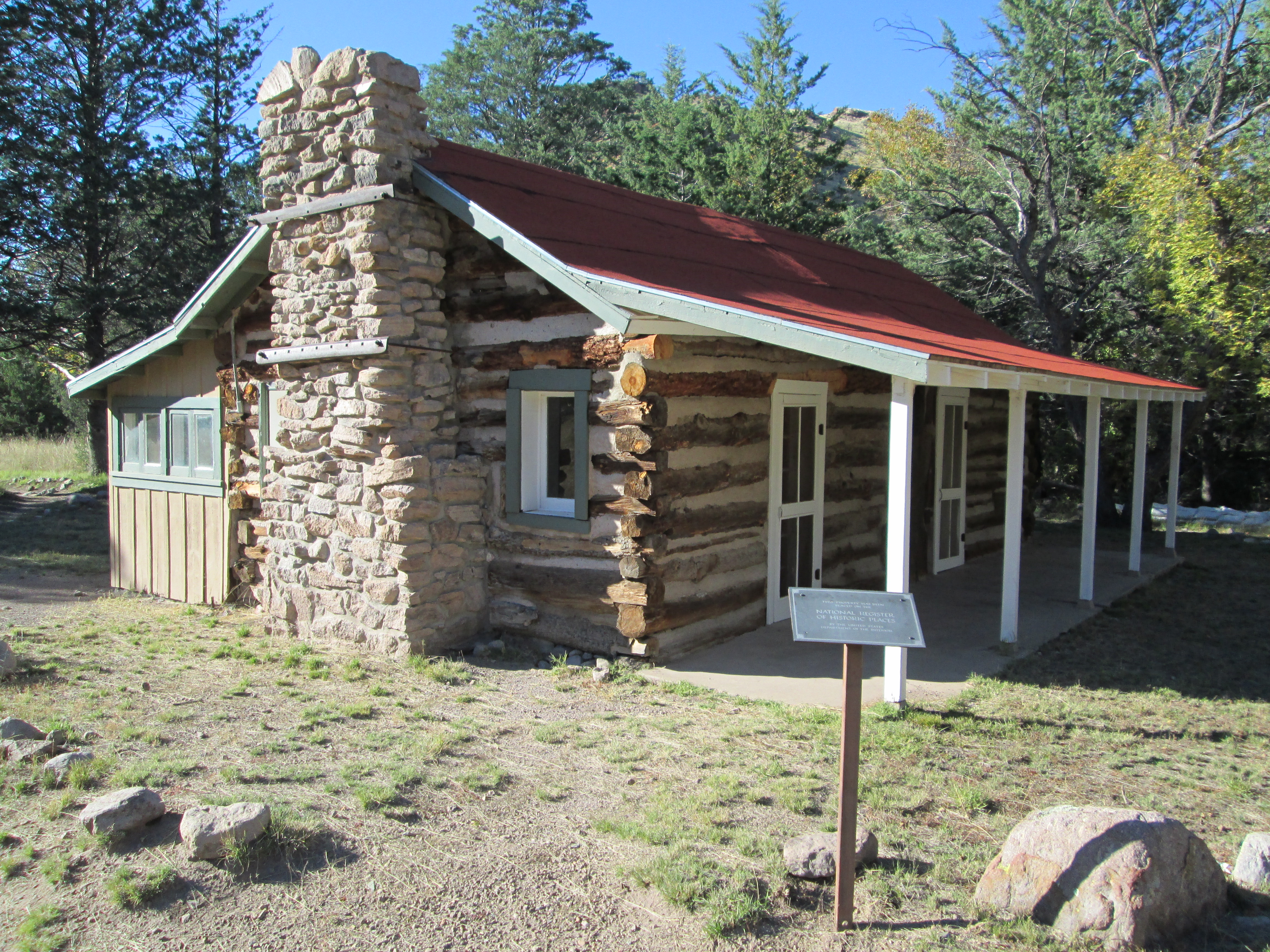
Stafford Cabin

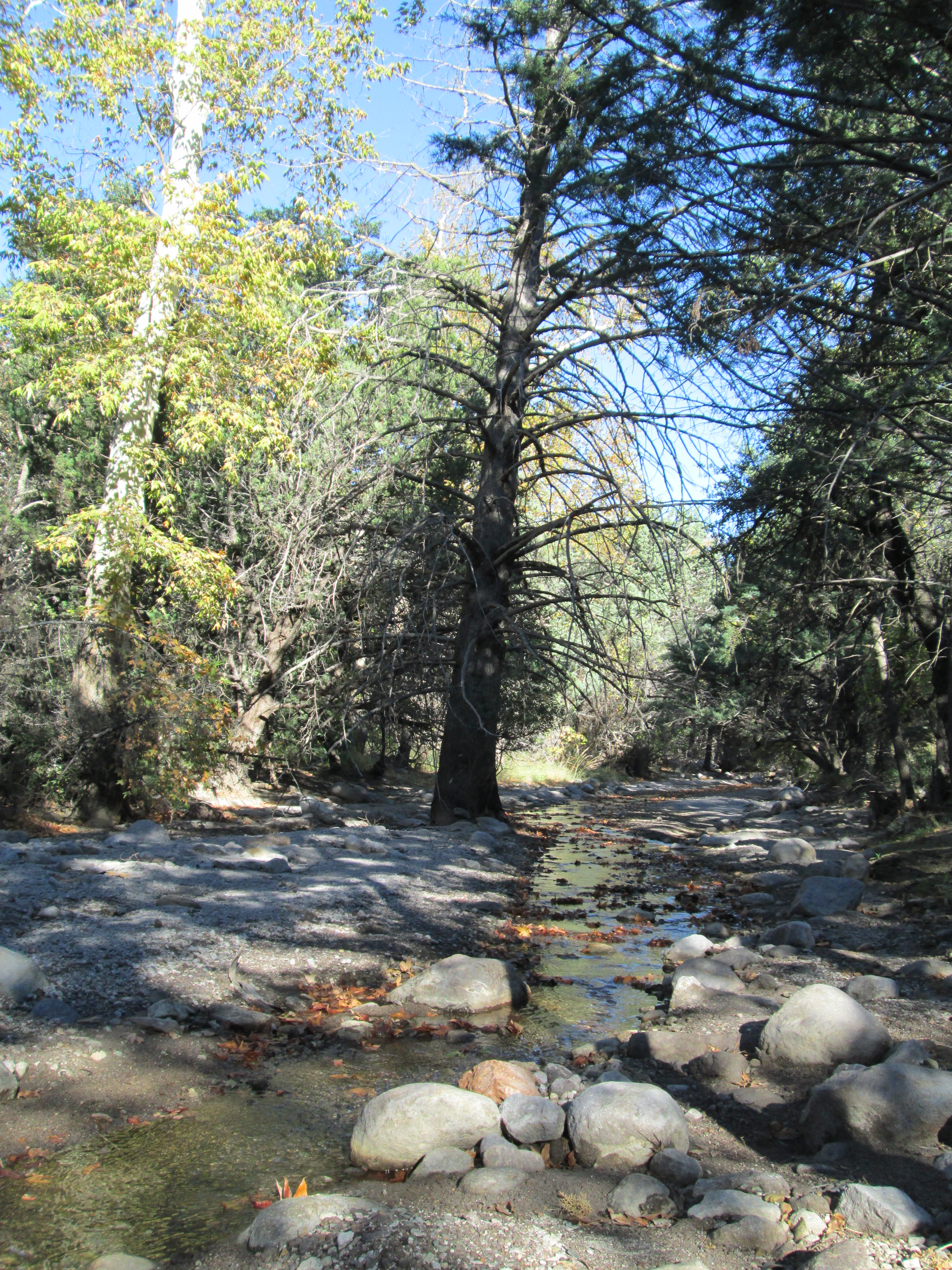
Bonita Creek

== See also ==
- San Bernardino Ranch
- Brown Canyon Ranch
- San Rafael Ranch
- National Register of Historic Places listings in Cochise County, Arizona
- Ranches on the National Register of Historic Places in Arizona
