= Bonita Canyon =

Canyon in the Chiricahua National Monument, Arizona

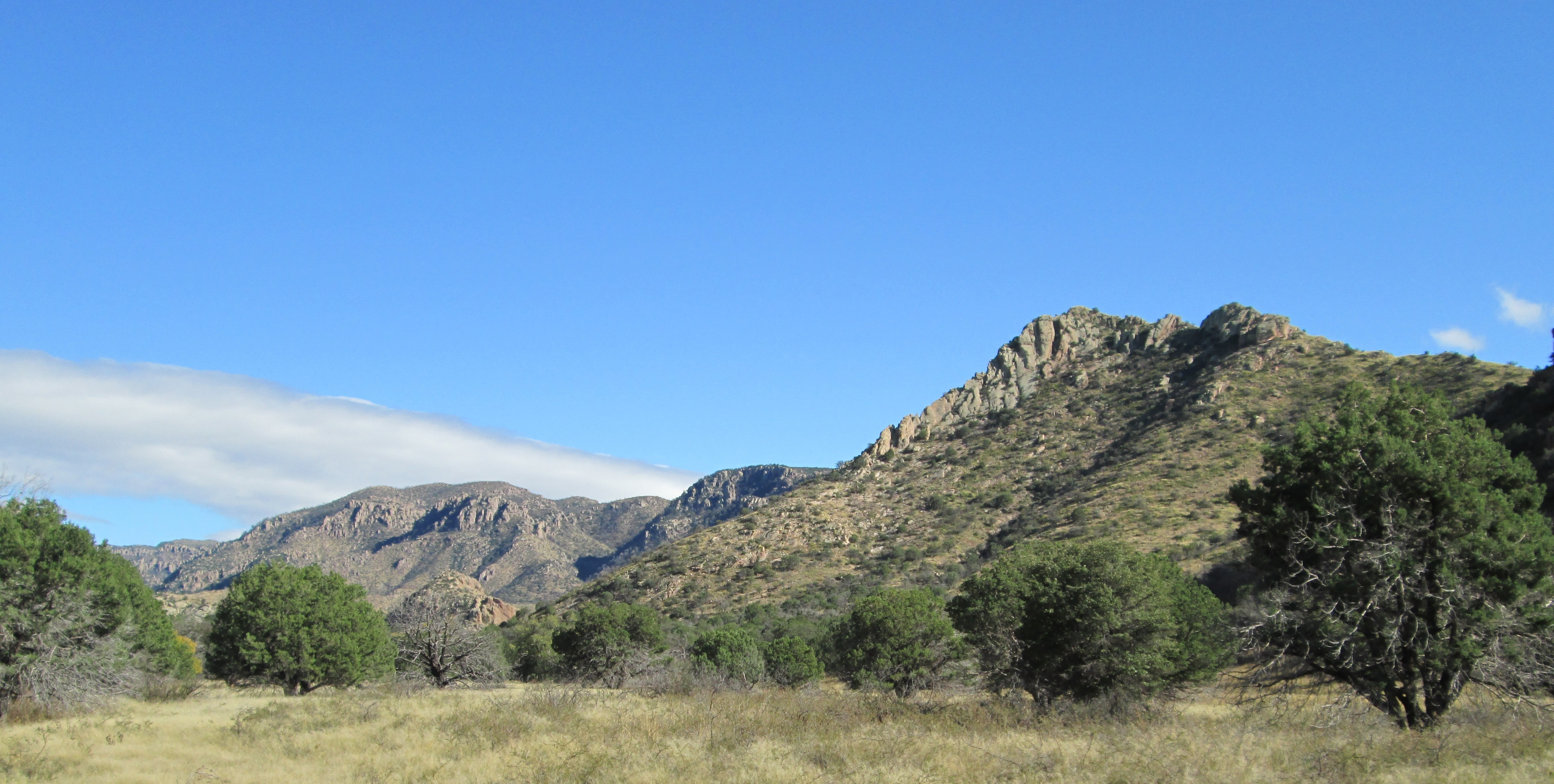
- Bonita Canyon, facing east from the Bonita Creek picnic area

- Location within Arizona
- Floor elevation: 5,360 ft (1,630 m)

Geography
- Location: Chiricahua Mountains, Arizona, United States
- Coordinates: 32°00′29″N 109°21′24″W GNIS data
- Topo map: Cochise Head, AZ
- Rivers: Bonita Creek
- Interactive map of Bonita Canyon

Bonita Canyon is a box canyon on the western slope of the Chiricahua Mountains in southeastern Arizona, which lies at 5,360 feet (1,630 m) in elevation and opens in a southwesterly direction into the Sulphur Springs Valley.

The canyon walls are capped with outcroppings of volcanic tuff and separated by a narrow valley about a quarter of a mile wide. Bonita Creek flows west through the northern edge of the valley, along the northern wall of the canyon. The valley is carpeted with a variety of wild grasses and forested with oak and Arizona cypress. Animal life includes mountain lions, bobcats, black bear, mule deer, various bird and reptile species, and much more. Jaguars have also been spotted in the canyon.

Bonita Canyon is now part of Chiricahua National Park and is also home to the Faraway Ranch Historic District, as well as a public campground. The headquarters for the Chiricahua National Monument is located just outside Bonita Canyon in the adjoining Madrone Canyon, near the Faraway Ranch.

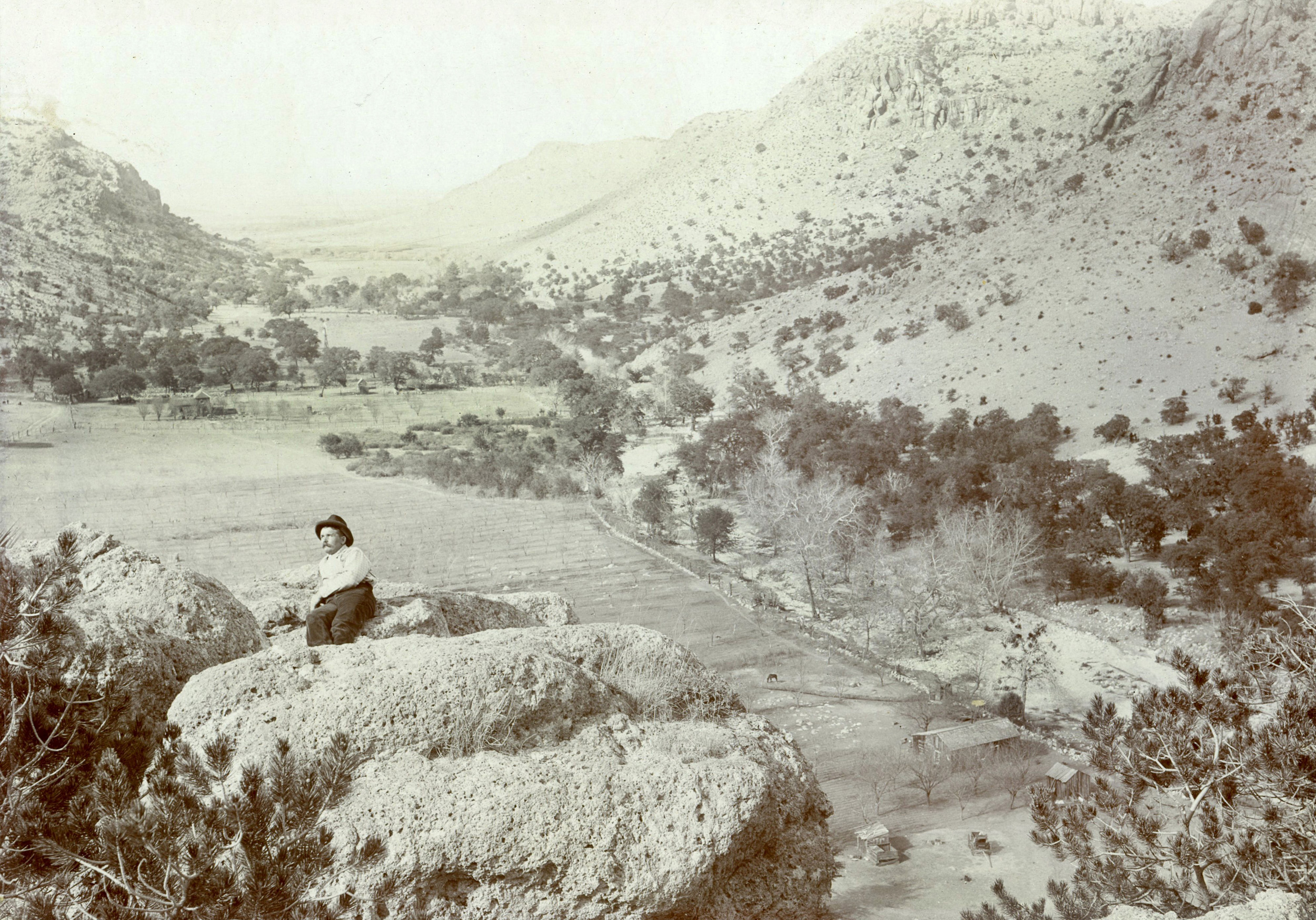
Neil Erickson relaxing on top of a rock formation in Bonita Canyon

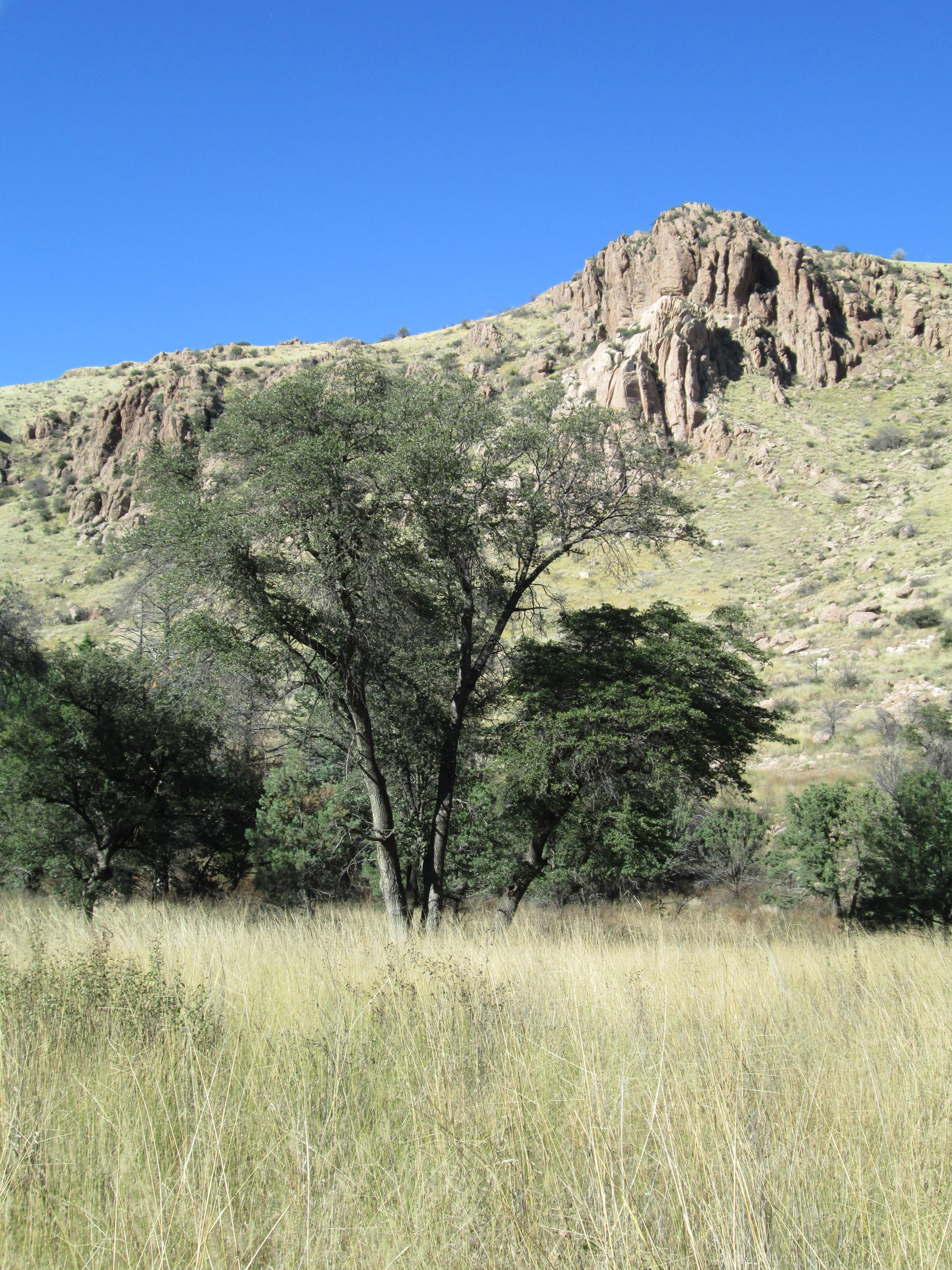
Oak woodland

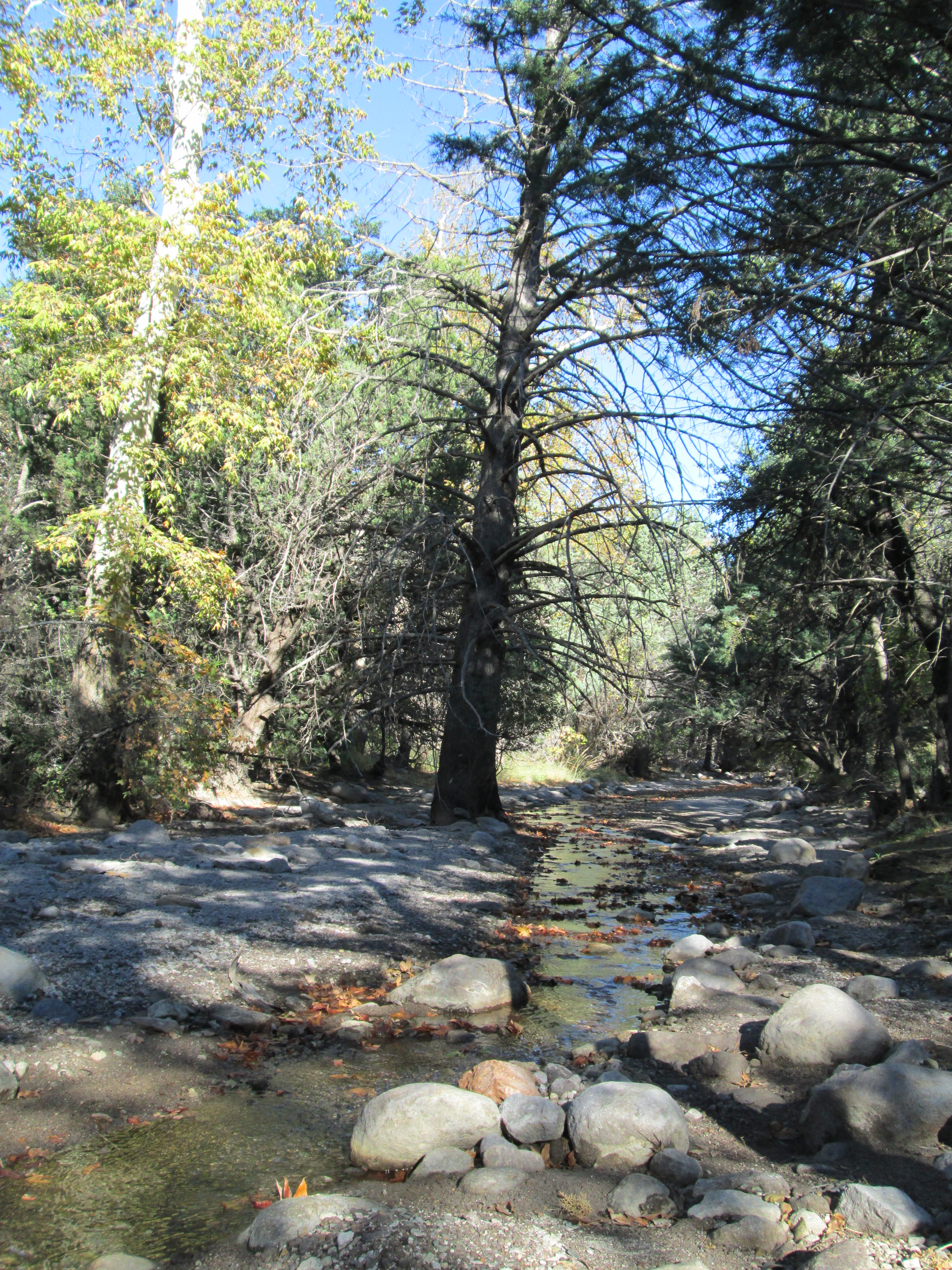
Bonita Creek

== See also ==
- List of rivers of Arizona
