= Geological history of the Chiricahua Mountains =

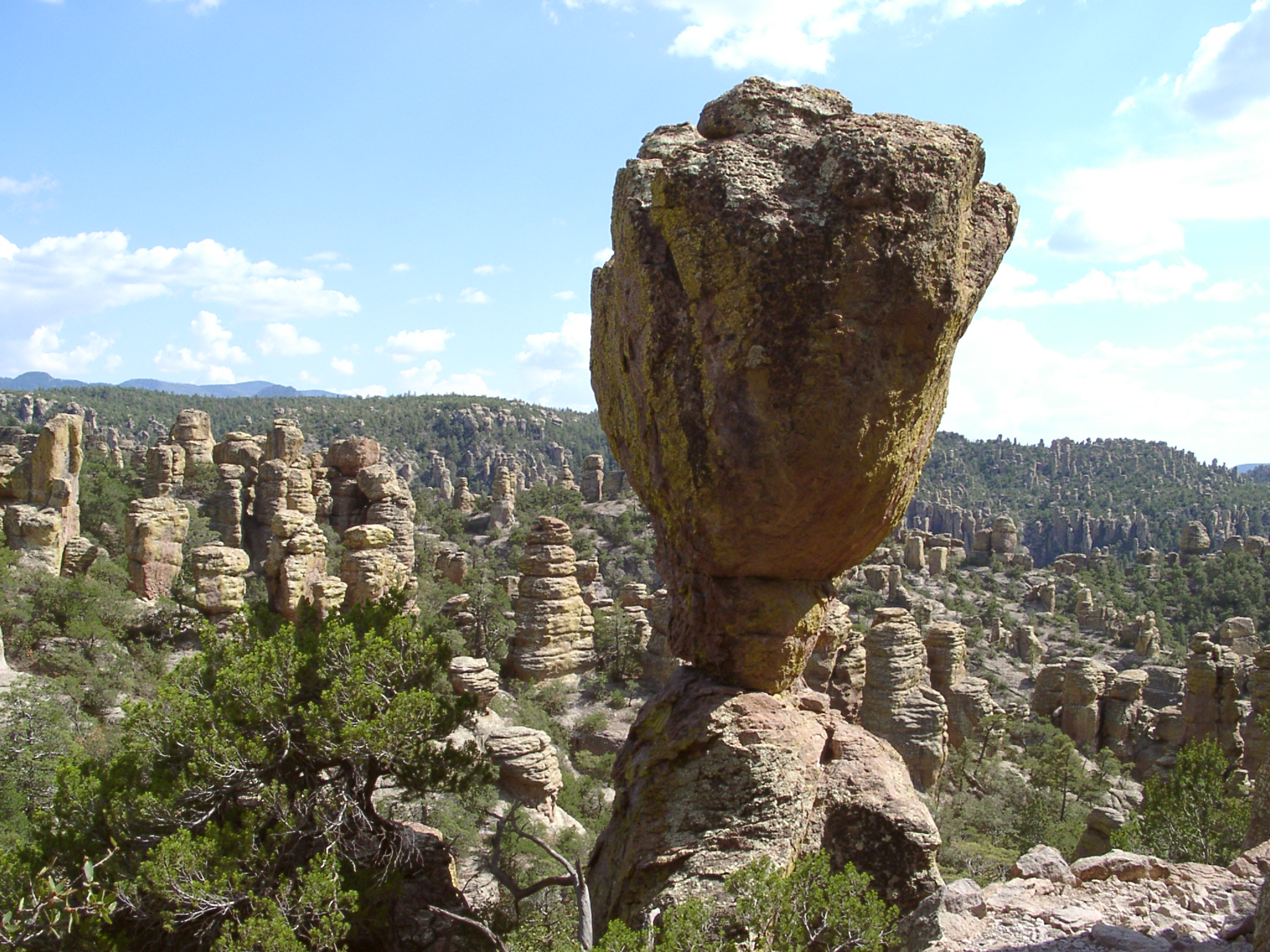
Balanced rock in Chiricahua National Park

The Geologic history of the Chiricahua Mountains concerns the Chiricahua Mountains, an inactive volcanic range located in Coronado National Forest of southeastern Arizona, in the United States. They are part of an "archipelago" of mountain ranges known as the sky islands that connect the Sierra Madre Occidental in Mexico with the Rocky Mountains. The Chiricahua Mountains are home to a number of unusual geologic features associated with the Turkey Creek Caldera, some of which are protected by Chiricahua National Park. The landscape has been dominantly shaped by faulting due to Basin and Range extension during the Miocene, volcanic activity, and erosion.

== Precambrian-Mesozoic ==
During the Precambrian, the southwestern coastline of North America extended as far north as the present-day borders of Wyoming and Colorado. Continental growth began around 1.8 billion years ago as a sequence of island arcs (separated by seas) moved to the northwest and accreted onto the edge of North America. By 1.4 Ga, most of Arizona had been added to the continent.

Paleozoic deposition in southeast Arizona occurred from about 510 to 251 Ma in a passive margin setting. Throughout this time, the area was covered by an ancient sea and thick layers of limestone and sandstone were deposited. Permian-aged strata rich in fossil brachiopods, echinoid spines, and gastropods are the only Paleozoic rocks exposed in the Chiricahua Mountains, and reflect a shallow-marine coral reef environment. These rocks are also the oldest known rocks exposed in the Chiricahuas and were formed around 280 Ma.

A 150-million-year unconformity in the Chiricahua Mountains’ geologic history occurs between the Paleozoic and earliest known Mesozoic rocks due to a period of uplift and erosion. Numerous volcanoes then formed in southeastern Arizona during the Mesozoic as oceanic crust subducted beneath the southwestern portion of the United States, resulting in continued continental growth.

== Volcanic activity in the Cenozoic ==
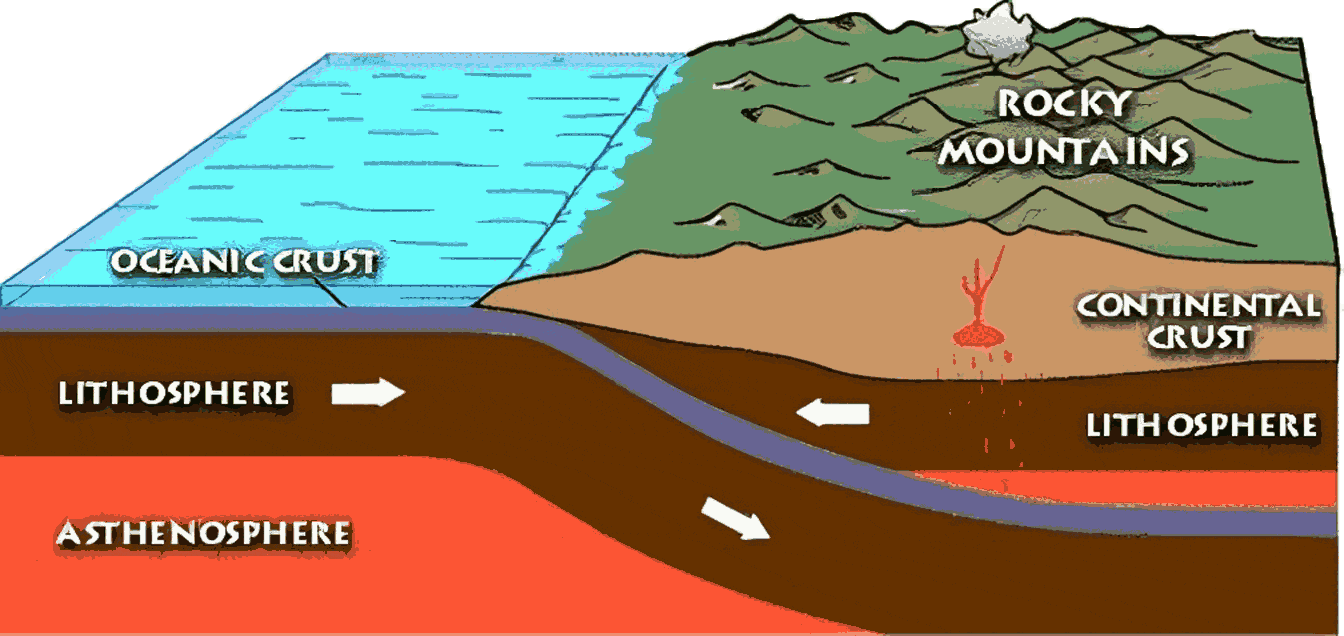
Diagram showing the shallow subduction of the Farallon Plate below the North American Plate that led to an increase in volcanism during the Laramide orogeny

The most active period in the volcanic history of the Chiricahua Mountains began near the end of the Mesozoic. Volcanism, as well as the formation of compressional structures, were due to the presence of a subduction zone beneath the southwest United States associated with the Laramide orogeny. This period began around 70 Ma with the subduction of the Farallon and Kula plates beneath the North American Plate, and ended around 20 Ma when the Pacific Plate’s spreading ridge ran into the subduction zone. The subduction of these slabs led to a period of intense volcanic activity in the western United States, and specifically in the Chiricahua Mountains around 35-25 Ma. Small, scattered volcanoes formed in the area, producing dark andesitic and basaltic lava flows, along with more viscous rhyolite flows. Around 26.9 Ma, a massive magma chamber formed beneath the crust just south of the present-day Chiricahua National Monument. The overlying rock eventually ruptured, expelling around 100 cubic miles of magma. Pyroclastic flows of hot silicious ash and pumice were laid down over a 1,200-square-mile region that eventually cooled and lithified into rhyolitic tuff. The volume of material ejected was sufficiently massive to cause the magma chamber to collapse and form what is now known as the Turkey Creek Caldera. It is estimated that the eruption was one thousand times greater than the 1980 eruption of Mount St. Helens. Large folds and faults associated with compressional tectonics can also be observed in Paleozoic and Mesozoic sedimentary rocks.

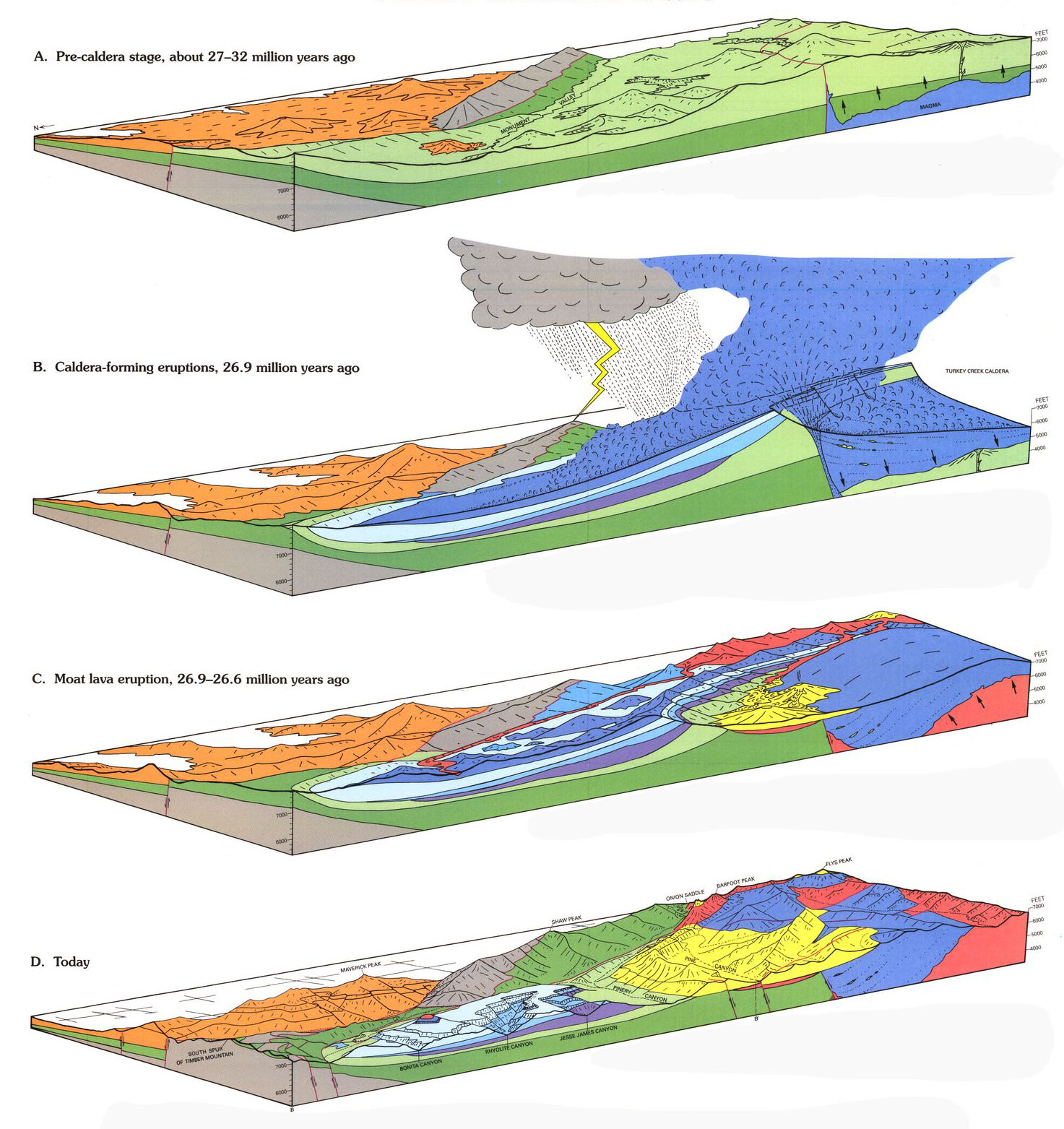
A) Before the Turkey Creek Caldera, the Chiricahua Mountains were made up of uplifted masses of Paleozoic and Mesozoic sedimentary rocks overlain and surrounded by active volcano fields. B) A series of massive eruptions blanketed a vast area of southern New Mexico and Arizona with hot ash. The Turkey Creek Caldera formed during this interval. C) A moat, or circular valley, formed when dacite magma (red) uplifted the center of the caldera. Two separate eruptions of dacite magma and rhyolite magma caused lava to flow into the moat and the Monument valley. D) Today's landscape has been greatly shaped by erosion, faulting, and landslides.

== Basin and Range faulting ==
When the spreading ridge of the Pacific Plate ran into the subduction zone along the west coast of the United States, subduction ceased and volcanism diminished. Rising heat led to extreme thinning of the crust and caused it to bulge upward. High-angle normal faults formed to accommodate the extension, creating a vast alternating system of mountains and valleys, or, more specifically, horsts and grabens. These north–south trending structures are the distinguishing characteristic of what is now known as the Basin and Range Province. The Chiricahua Mountains lie within this province and graben blocks are the most common structure found. Extension continues today due to pressure from the San Andreas Fault that runs through the length of California. Extension also led to the formation of more volcanic features. Small amounts of basaltic magma leaked out and formed the San Bernardino volcanic field (San Bernardino Valley) along the southeastern flank of the mountains between Rodeo, New Mexico, and Douglas, Arizona. Cinder cones, lavas, and small explosion craters are still clearly seen today.

== Sculpting the modern landscape ==
During the past 27 million years, faulting and erosion have had the greatest impact on the landscape and topography of the Chiricahua Mountains. Uplift continued into the Quaternary, subjecting the mountains to increased erosion. Alluvial fans formed along the flanks of the range as down-cutting streams flushed sediments from the canyons. The most notable geologic features in the mountains are found in the Chiricahua National Monument. Massive stone columns, or hoodoos, blanket the area and are the result of hundreds of thousands of years of weathering and erosion. The hoodoos originated from a thick deposit of tuff laid down by the Turkey Creek Caldera. As the tuff cooled, it contracted and formed joints. Differential chemical and physical weathering concentrated along these joints, initiating the formation of thousands of rock columns. Balanced rocks that perch, sometimes precariously, on top of many of the hoodoos are a distinctive feature of the monument.

== See also ==
- Geologic map of the Chiricahua Mountains
