= Chiricahua National Park =

National park in Arizona, U.S.

- IUCN category V (protected landscape/seascape)
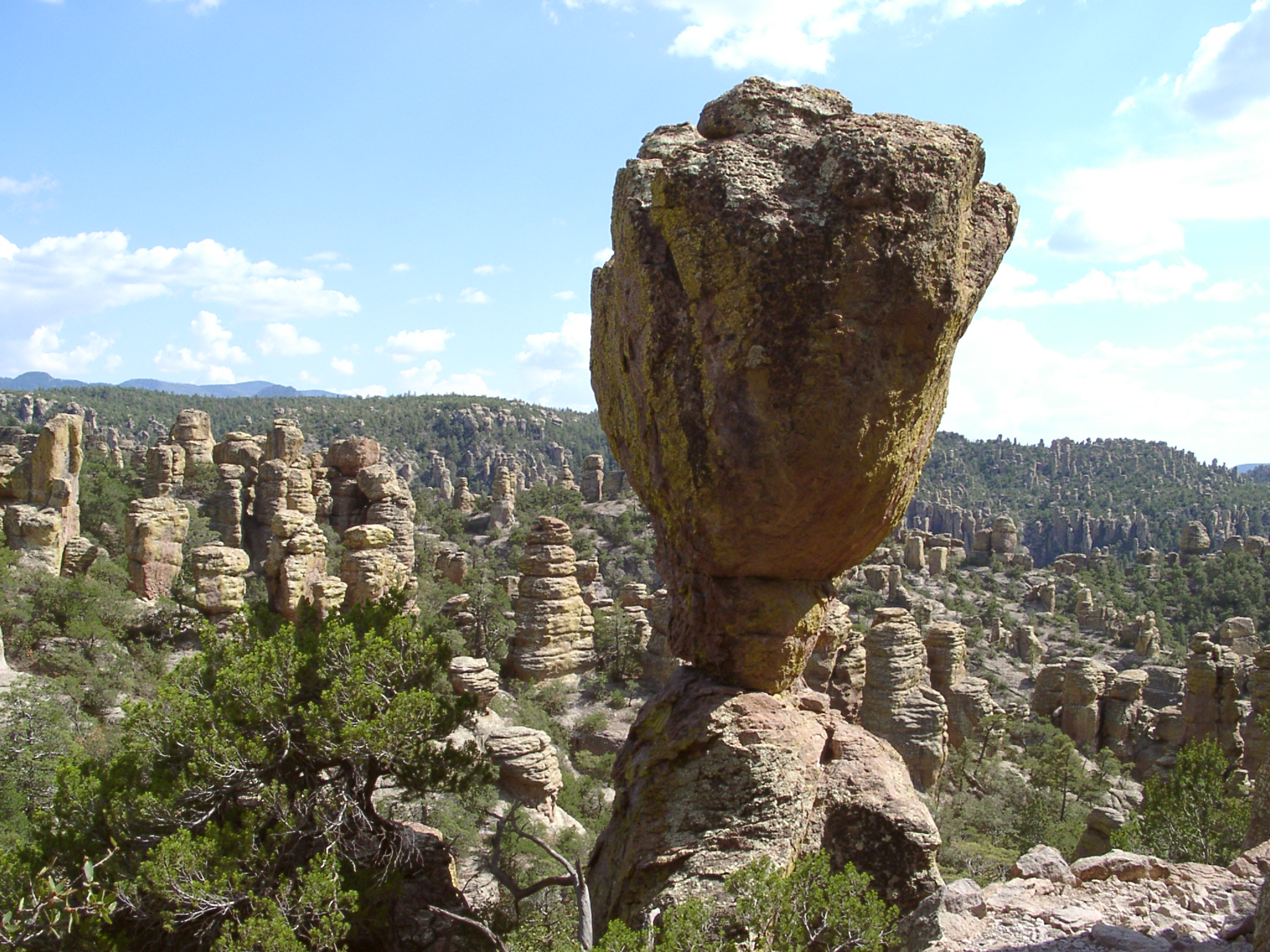
- Rock formation on Echo Canyon Trail

- Location within Arizona Location within the United States
- Interactive map of Chiricahua National Park
- Location: Cochise County, Arizona, United States
- Nearest city: Willcox, Arizona
- Coordinates: 32°00′20″N 109°21′24″W
- Area: 12,025 acres (48.66 km^{2})
- Created: April 18, 1924 (as a national monument); October 20, 2026 (as a national park)
- Visitors: 70,406 (in 2025)
- Governing body: National Park Service
- Website: Chiricahua National Park

Chiricahua National Park is a national park of the United States located in the Chiricahua Mountains of southeastern Arizona. Originally established as Chiricahua National Monument on April 18, 1924, the park was created to protect the area's extensive hoodoos and balancing rocks. It was redesignated as the nation's 64th national park on October 20, 2026. The Faraway Ranch, which was owned at one time by Swedish immigrants Neil and Emma Erickson, is also preserved within the national park. Just over 85% of the park is protected as the Chiricahua Wilderness.

== Geology ==
Located approximately 36 miles (58 km) southeast of Willcox, Arizona, the park preserves the remains of an immense volcanic eruption that shook the region about 27 million years ago. The thick, white-hot ash spewed forth from the nearby Turkey Creek Caldera, cooled and hardened into rhyolitic tuff, laying down almost 2,000 ft (610 m) of highly siliceous, dark volcanic ash and pumice. The volcanic material eventually eroded into the natural rock formations of the present monument.

== History ==
President Calvin Coolidge established the national monument with the Antiquities Act on April 18, 1924. It was expanded by President Franklin Roosevelt on June 10, 1938.

=== Missing ranger ===
On January 13, 1980, Paul Fugate, a National Park Service naturalist and law enforcement ranger, disappeared after leaving the monument headquarters while in uniform, to check trails leading to the recently acquired Faraway Ranch. An acquaintance claimed to have seen him later that afternoon, slumped between two men in a pickup truck. Despite an extensive search of the rugged 17 sq mi (44 km^{2}) monument area by authorities and search and rescue teams, no trace of him has been found.

=== Historic Designed Landscape ===
- Chiricahua National Monument Historic Designed Landscape
- U.S. National Register of Historic Places
- U.S. Historic district
- Location: 12856 E. Rhyolite Canyon Rd., Chiricahua National Park, near Willcox, Arizona
- Area: approx. 10,000 acres
- Built: 1924–1940
- MPS: Historic Park Landscapes in National and State Parks MPS
- NRHP reference No.: 08001020
- Added to NRHP: October 31, 2008

Chiricahua National Monument Historic Designed Landscape is a historic district that covers roughly 80% of the national monument. The district was listed on the National Register of Historic Places on October 31, 2008.

It was the 18th property listed as a featured property of the week in a program of the National Park Service that began in July 2008.

=== Redesignation to National Park ===
In 2022, the US Senate passed S. 1320 to redesignate the monument as a national park. The bill did not make it out of committee in the House and died with the conclusion of the 117th Congress. In early 2023, Senator Mark Kelly introduced S. 736 in the Senate, while Representative Juan Ciscomani introduced HR 1479 in the House to redesignate the Monument as a Park. The 2023 bills passed out of committee in the Senate but did not move ahead in the House. In the 119th Congress, Ciscomani reintroduced the bill in the House as HR 6380 in December 2025. The House passed the bill in March 2026, as did the Senate in September 2026, both via unanimous consent. In October 2026, President Donald Trump signed the bill into law, redesignating Chiricahua into a national park.

The conversion of Chiricahua National Monument to Chiricahua National Park was pushed for various reasons. Secretary of the Interior Doug Burgum stated, “This new designation will shine a national spotlight on one of Arizona’s hidden gems, creating opportunities to welcome more visitors, strengthen local economies and share this incredible landscape with more Americans.” Additionally, the classification of “National Park” protects the landscapes within the area. It preserves the park’s towering rock spires and balanced rocks.

== Visitor center ==
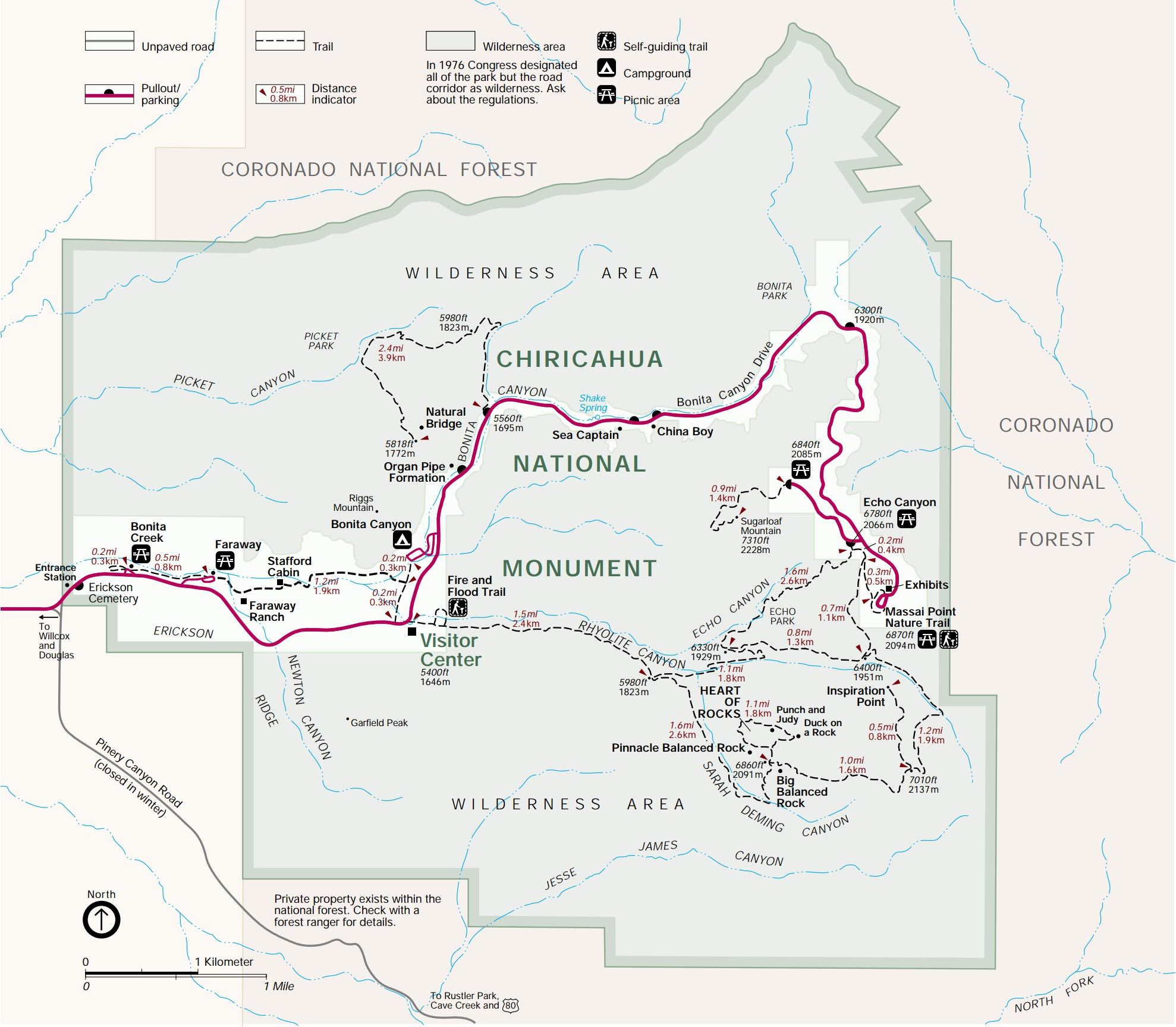
Park map (click on map to enlarge)

A visitor center is located 2 miles (3.2 km) from the entrance to Chiricahua National Park. The visitor center has exhibits relating to the geology, natural history, and cultural history of the area. A park ranger is available to provide visitors with trail guides and information. The main road, Bonita Canyon Drive, ventures 8 mi (13 km) east through the park, ending at Massai Point. Approximately 17 mi (27 km) of trails lead hikers through various ecosystems of meadows, forests, and rock formations.

The visitor center has a free shuttle that takes hikers to the Echo Canyon or Massai Point trailheads. Hikers return to the visitor center by following the designated trails.

== Gallery ==
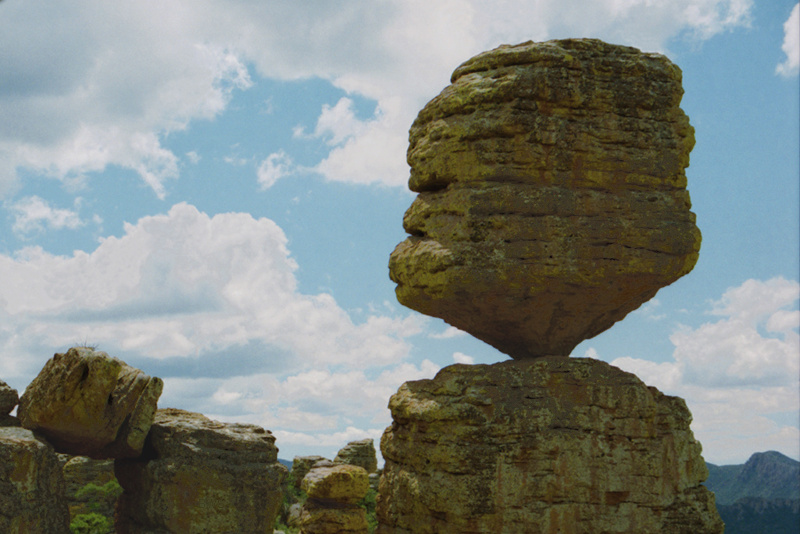
Big Balanced Rock along the Heart of Rocks trail

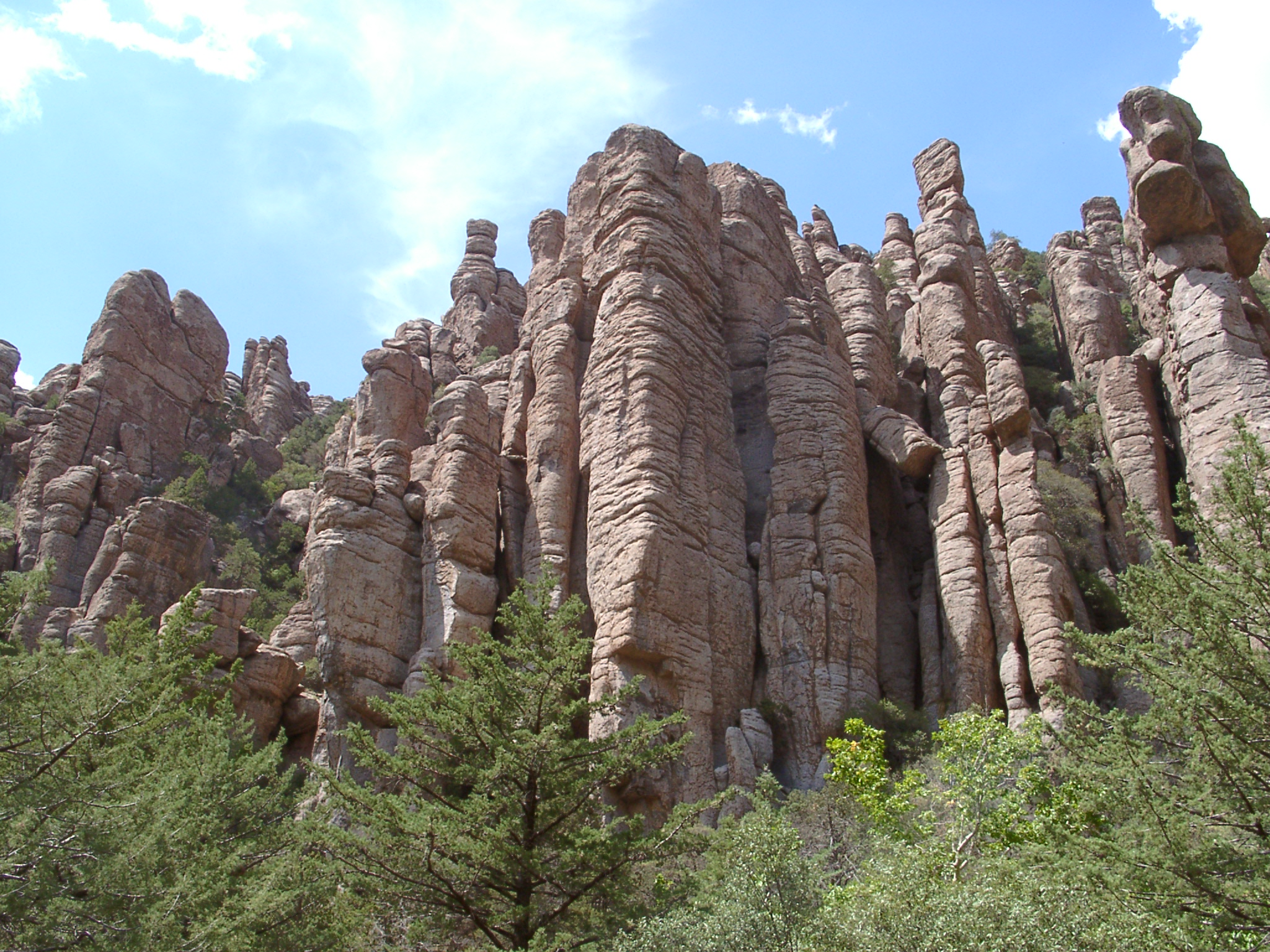
Stone columns, called hoodoos, are the most common formation in the park

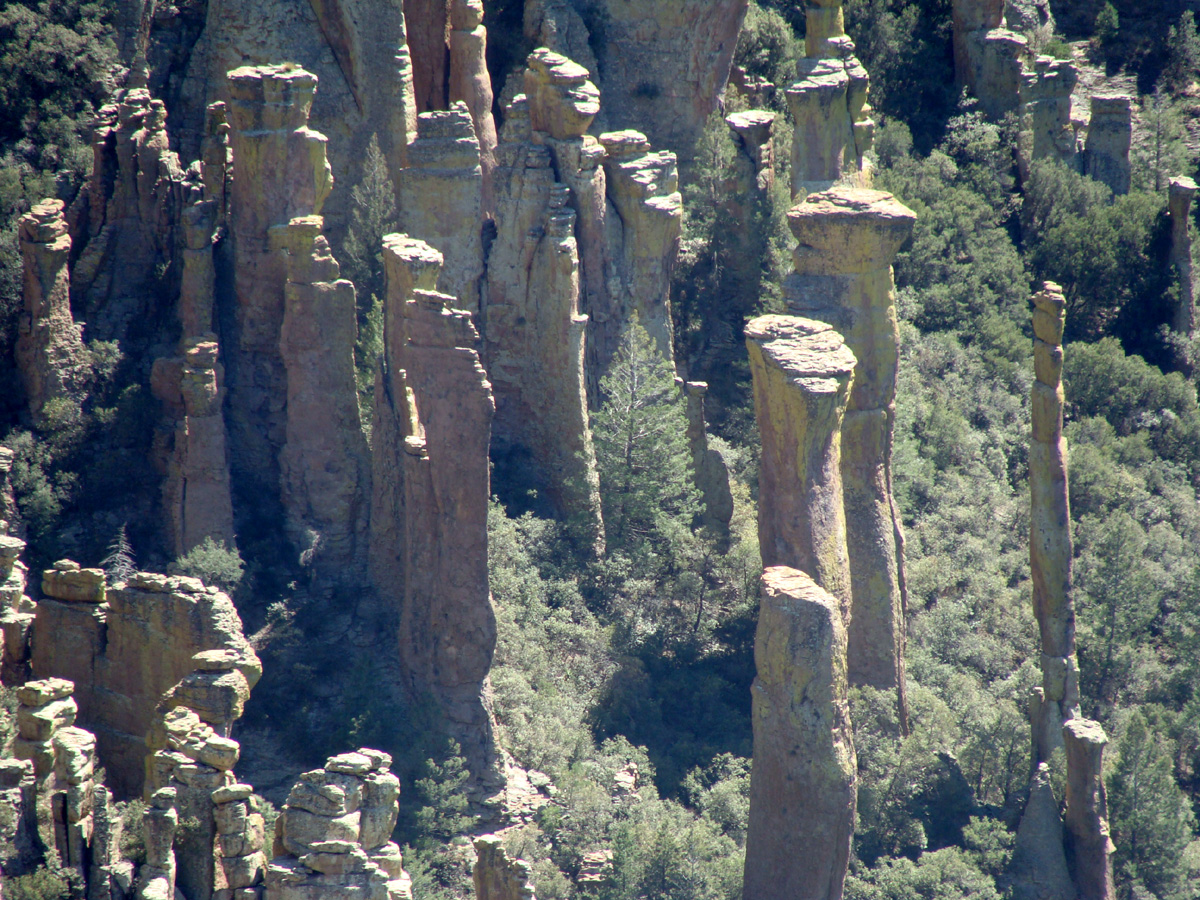
Hoodoos in Totem Canyon
180° panoramic view of Chiricahua National Park

== Climate ==
According to the Köppen Climate Classification system, Chiricahua National Park has a hot-summer mediterranean climate, abbreviated "Csa" on climate maps. The hottest temperature recorded at Chiricahua National Park was 109 °F (42.8 °C) on July 13, 1909, while the coldest temperature recorded was −10 °F (−23.3 °C) on January 7, 1913.

Climate data for Chiricahua National Park, Arizona, 1991–2020 normals, extremes 1909–2007
Month	Jan	Feb	Mar	Apr	May	Jun	Jul	Aug	Sep	Oct	Nov	Dec	Year
Record high °F (°C)	80 (27)	80 (27)	86 (30)	93 (34)	104 (40)	108 (42)	109 (43)	103 (39)	100 (38)	95 (35)	85 (29)	82 (28)	109 (43)
Mean daily maximum °F (°C)	56.0 (13.3)	60.6 (15.9)	66.5 (19.2)	73.8 (23.2)	82.7 (28.2)	91.4 (33.0)	90.2 (32.3)	86.7 (30.4)	83.8 (28.8)	76.4 (24.7)	66.4 (19.1)	55.7 (13.2)	74.2 (23.4)
Daily mean °F (°C)	43.1 (6.2)	46.6 (8.1)	51.5 (10.8)	57.2 (14.0)	65.7 (18.7)	74.2 (23.4)	75.1 (23.9)	73.4 (23.0)	70.2 (21.2)	61.8 (16.6)	52.0 (11.1)	43.1 (6.2)	59.5 (15.3)
Mean daily minimum °F (°C)	30.3 (−0.9)	32.6 (0.3)	36.5 (2.5)	40.5 (4.7)	48.8 (9.3)	57.0 (13.9)	60.0 (15.6)	60.0 (15.6)	56.6 (13.7)	47.2 (8.4)	37.5 (3.1)	30.5 (−0.8)	44.8 (7.1)
Record low °F (°C)	−10 (−23)	7 (−14)	10 (−12)	20 (−7)	19 (−7)	35 (2)	40 (4)	44 (7)	33 (1)	21 (−6)	8 (−13)	−1 (−18)	−10 (−23)
Average precipitation inches (mm)	1.32 (34)	1.28 (33)	1.19 (30)	0.27 (6.9)	0.30 (7.6)	0.86 (22)	3.81 (97)	4.56 (116)	1.59 (40)	0.99 (25)	1.04 (26)	1.50 (38)	18.71 (475.5)
Average snowfall inches (cm)	1.3 (3.3)	0.5 (1.3)	0.2 (0.51)	0.0 (0.0)	0.0 (0.0)	0.0 (0.0)	0.0 (0.0)	0.0 (0.0)	0.0 (0.0)	0.1 (0.25)	0.4 (1.0)	1.2 (3.0)	3.7 (9.36)
Average precipitation days (≥ 0.01 in)	5.4	5.4	4.6	2.0	2.2	3.5	13.1	12.6	6.3	4.2	4.0	5.5	68.8
Average snowy days (≥ 0.1 in)	0.5	0.5	0.1	0.0	0.0	0.0	0.0	0.0	0.0	0.1	0.2	0.4	1.8
Source 1: NOAA
Source 2: National Weather Service

== See also ==
- List of national monuments of the United States
- List of national parks of the United States
- List of areas in the United States National Park System
- National Register of Historic Places listings in Cochise County, Arizona
