= Little Boquillas Ranch =

Historic ranch in Cochise County, Arizona

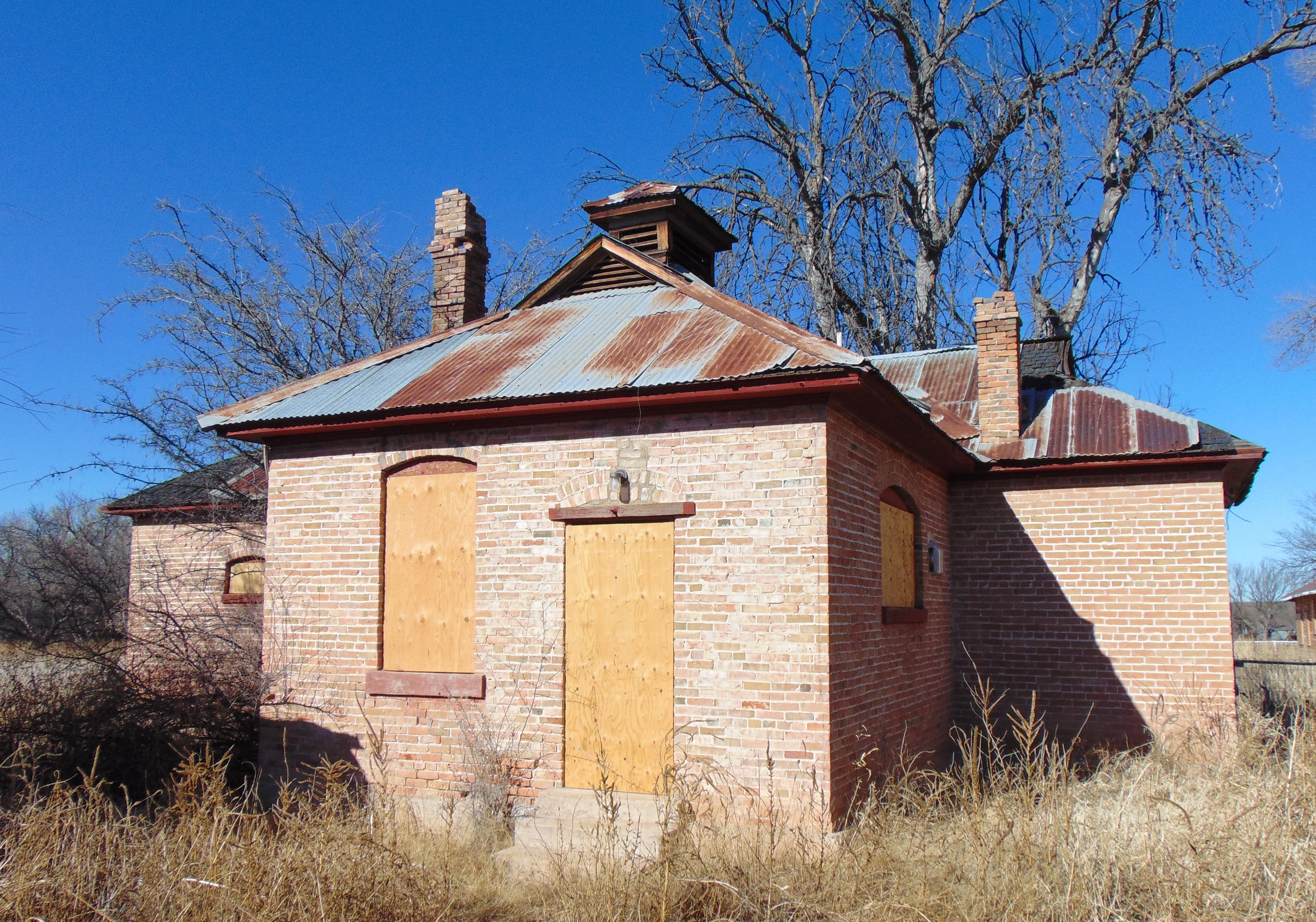
- The Little Boquillas Ranch House
- Type: Cattle ranch
- Location: Fairbank, Arizona, U.S.
- Coordinates: 31°41′48″N 110°10′48″W
- Founded: 1901
- Owner: Kern County Land and Cattle Company

The Little Boquillas Ranch is an historic ranch property located in western Cochise County, Arizona, near the Fairbank Historic Townsite in what is now part of the San Pedro Riparian National Conservation Area.

== History ==
=== The ranch era ===
The Little Boquillas Ranch gets its name from the San Juan de las Boquillas y Nogales (Saint John of the Little Springs and Walnut Trees) land grant, which was granted to the family of Rafael Elias Gonzales by the Mexican government in 1833. The grant ran from a point near what is now the ghost town of Charleston, Arizona, north to a point just to the south of Fairbank, along the San Pedro River. The San Rafael del Valle grant, owned by Rafael's cousin, Captain Ignacio Elias Gonzales, was immediately to the south of the Boquillas grant and ran from what is now the community of Hereford north to Charleston. Both were roughly four "sitios", or approximately 18,000 acres, in size.

The early years were prosperous for the Mexican settlers, but they didn't last for long. The local Apaches soon started raiding again, leading to the abandonment of the area for the next few decades. By the late 1840s, the only remnant of the Mexican settlement were thousands of wild cattle left behind to roam freely on the open range. Following the end of the Mexican–American War (1846–1848) and the Gadsden Purchase in 1853, most of the San Pedro Valley became part of the United States, which agreed to acknowledge and respect the legitimacy of the old Spanish and Mexican land gants in the 1848 Treaty of Guadalupe Hidalgo. Apache raids continued, postponing the development of the area until the final quarter of the century, when silver and copper were discovered in the Tombstone and Bisbee areas, leading to a rush of incoming American settlers. Being the only land with a reliable source of water for miles around, the old Mexican land grants along the San Pedro River quickly filled up with American homesteaders and other settlers, many of whom made a living producing food and other necessities for the people in the nearby boomtowns and the soldiers at Fort Huachuca.

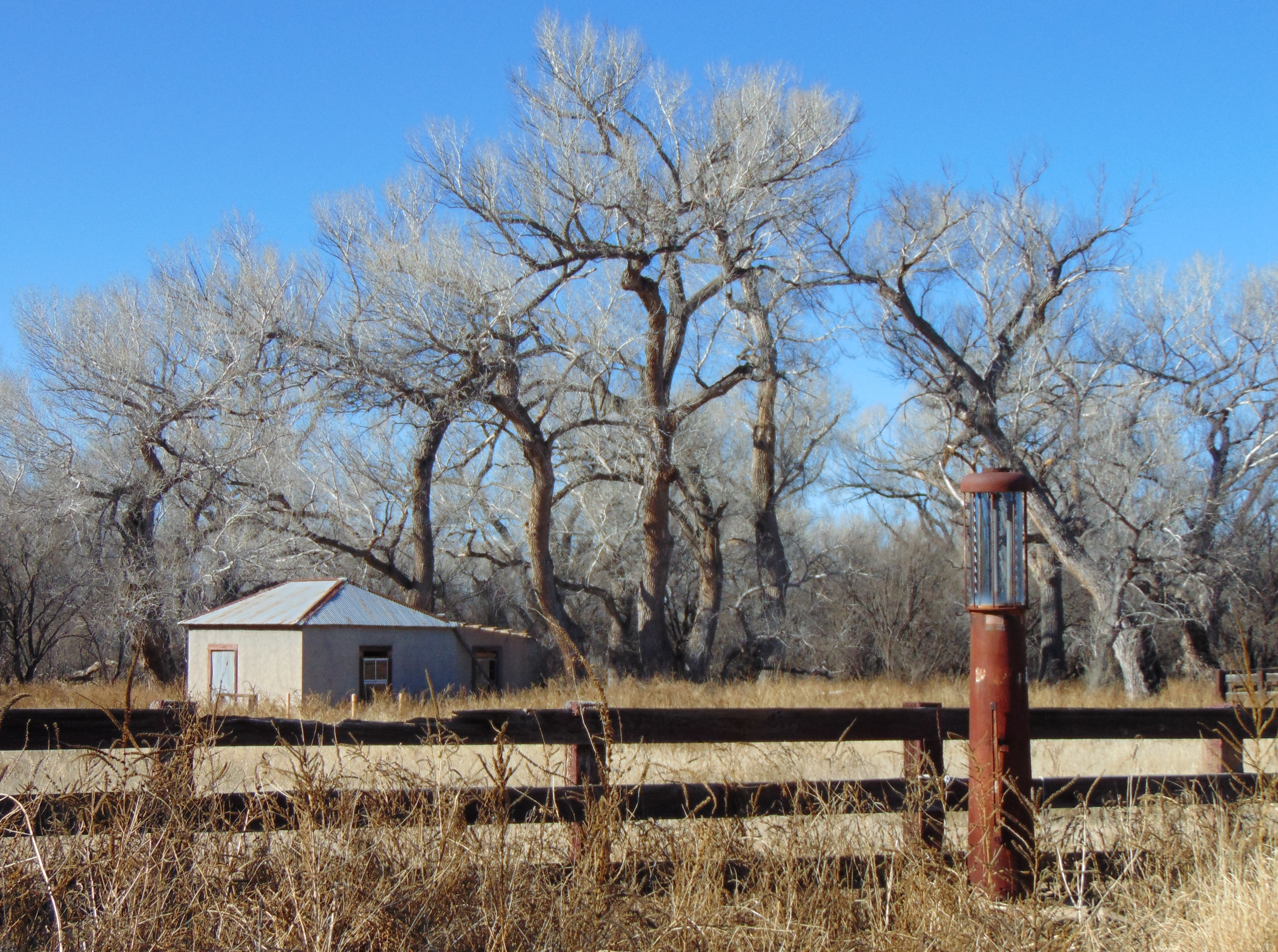
An old gas pump with the ruin of the blacksmith's shop and riparian trees in the background.

In 1880, the San Francisco businessman George Hearst and his partner, George Hill Howard, purchased the Boquillas land grant from the Elias family in Sonora. Hearst, who eventually became the sole owner of the property, began selling off parcels of land for townsites, mills, ranches, farms and a railroad soon after, making him responsible for much of the early development of the region. In 1891, the United States government established the Court of Private Land Claims to validate land grant claims and attempt to sort out the problems caused by the Surveyor Office, which had previously validated claims. The same year George Hearst died and his son, William Randolph Hearst, and his widow, Phoebe Hearst, filed papers to have their exclusive claim to the Boquillas land grant recognized. In 1899, the Land Claim Court ruled that only the Hearst family had valid title to the land grant, but not everyone was in agreement. A group of some thirty residents of the land grant soon filed a lawsuit to dispute the ruling, and although the case eventually made it to the highest court in the nation, the Supreme Court affirmed the decision of the Land Claims Court in 1906.

In 1901, while their case was still pending in the Supreme Court, the Hearst family sold the Boquillas land grant to the Kern County Land and Cattle Company, which was a large mining and ranching conglomerate based in California. Kerns formed the Boquillas Land and Cattle Company in 1901 and began raising cattle from a new headquarters established two miles south of Fairbank, called the Little Boquillas Ranch. The Boquillas Land and Cattle Company also moved to clear out their rangeland for cattle by evicting all of the "squatting" homesteaders. The Supreme Court's ruling in 1906 further served to depopulate the San Pedro Valley by triggering an exodus from the area. Boquillas allowed only a handful of favored families and their businesses to remain in Fairbank, along with a few other families living on land that had been sold previously by George Hearst.

=== National Conservation Area ===
The Little Boquillas Ranch continued raising livestock along the San Pedro River all the way up until 1971, when the Tenneco Oil Company gained title to the Boquillas land grants through the acquisition of the parent Kern County Land and Cattle Company. In 1986, the Boquillas and Del Valle grants were acquired by the Bureau of Land Management (BLM) in a land exchange to form what is now the San Pedro Riparian National Conservation Area, a large nature preserve that focuses on protecting and restoring the riparian corridor along the San Pedro River.

Several historic buildings and other structures associated with the early history of the Little Boquillas Ranch remain in the San Pedro National Conservation Area, including the Little Boquillas Ranch headquarters, the Fairbank Historic Townsite and the San Pedro House near Sierra Vista. The latter was built by the Boquillas Land and Cattle Company in the 1930s and is now used as a visitor center, bookshop and trailhead for accessing the San Pedro River.

== Remnants ==
The following historic buildings and structures are currently maintained by the BLM, which believes that most of the ranch development was in place by 1910:

- Ranch House: Red brick building
- Foreman's House: White wooden frame building
- Smokehouse: Red frame building next to the ranch house
- Blacksmith's shop: Adobe building next to barn
- Barn: Large red frame building attached to one of the corrals
- Corrals: Wooden fencing

== Gallery ==
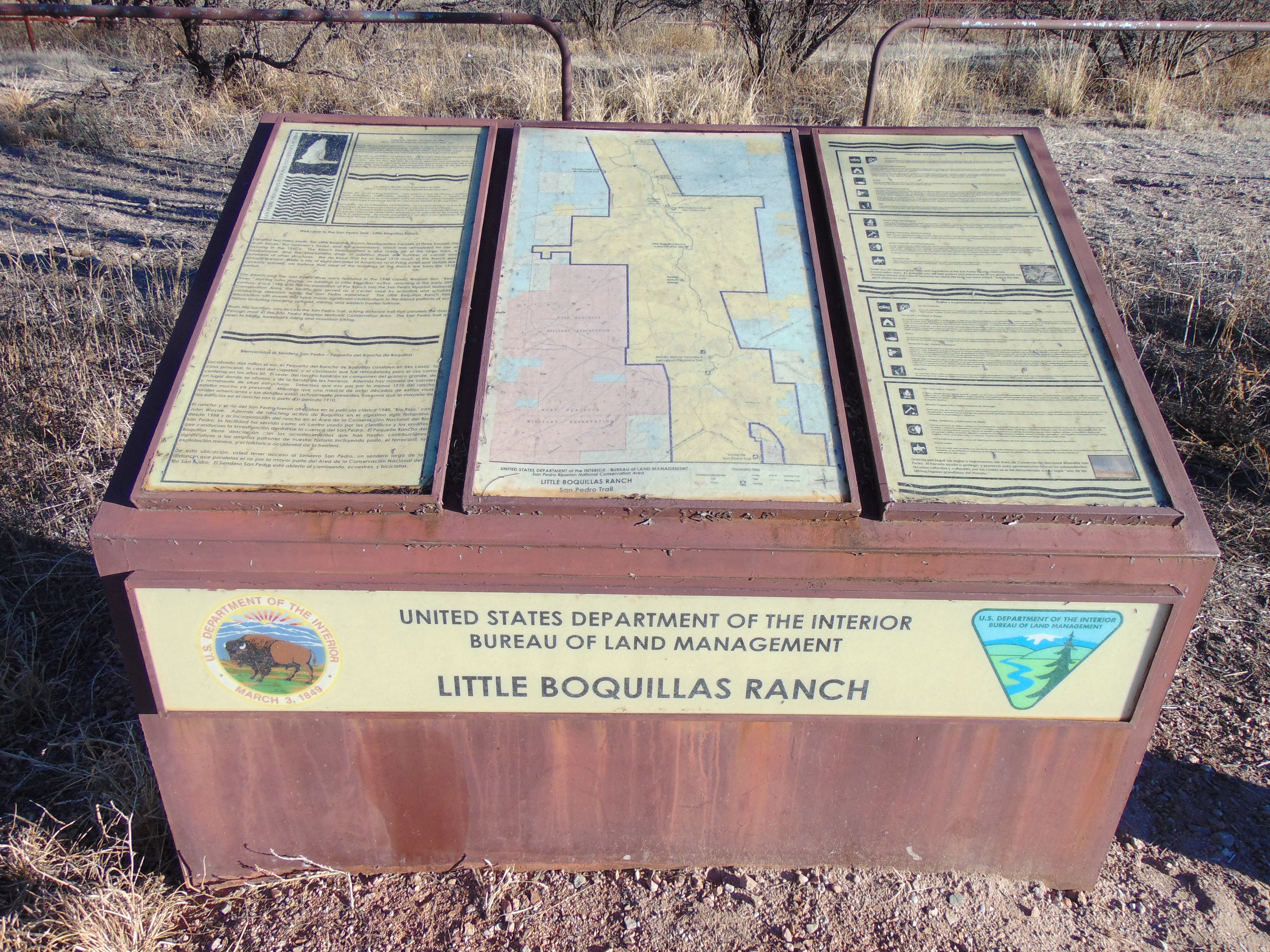
A historical marker for the Little Boquillas Ranch at the Fairbank Historic Townsite

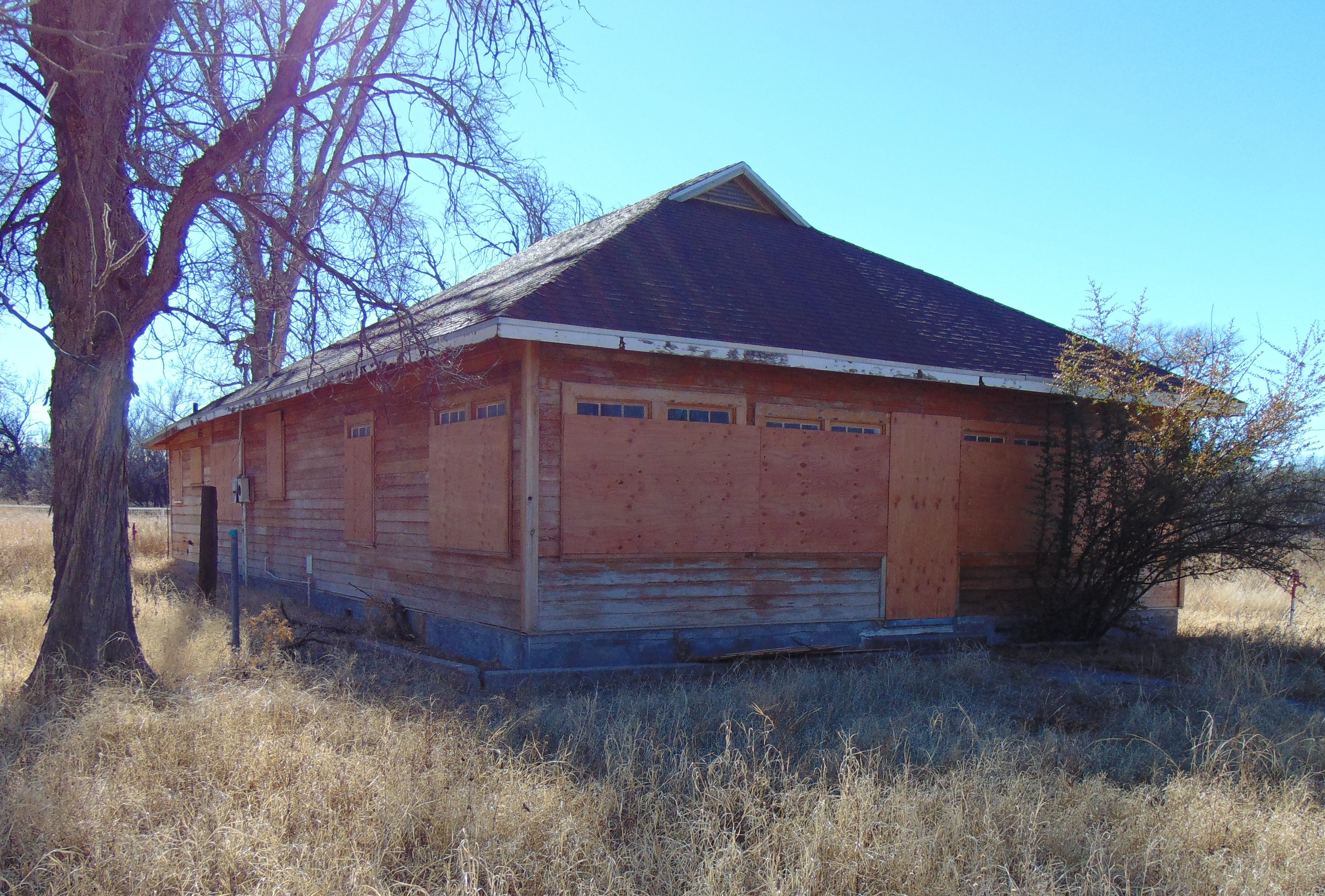
The foreman's house

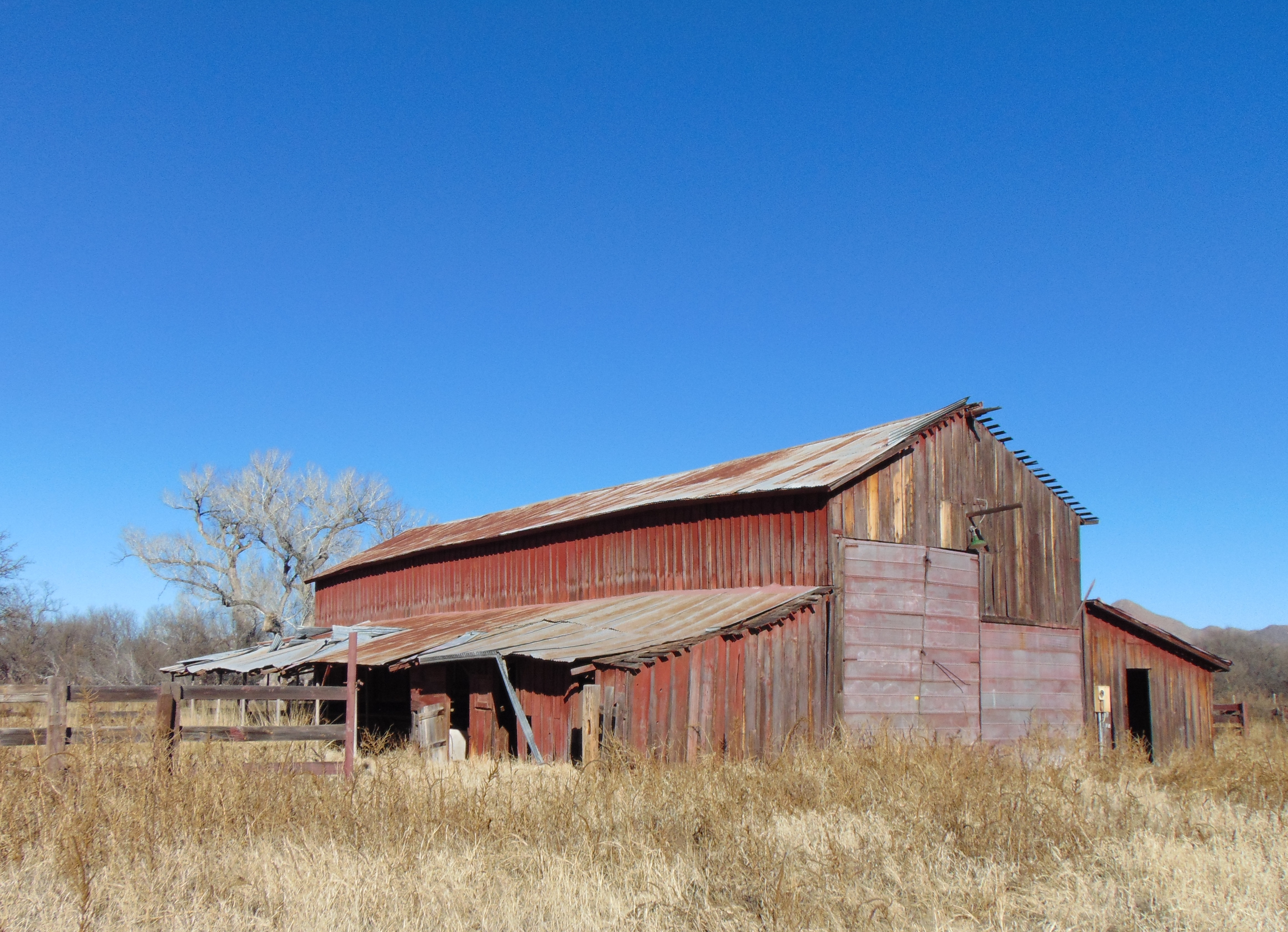
The big red barn

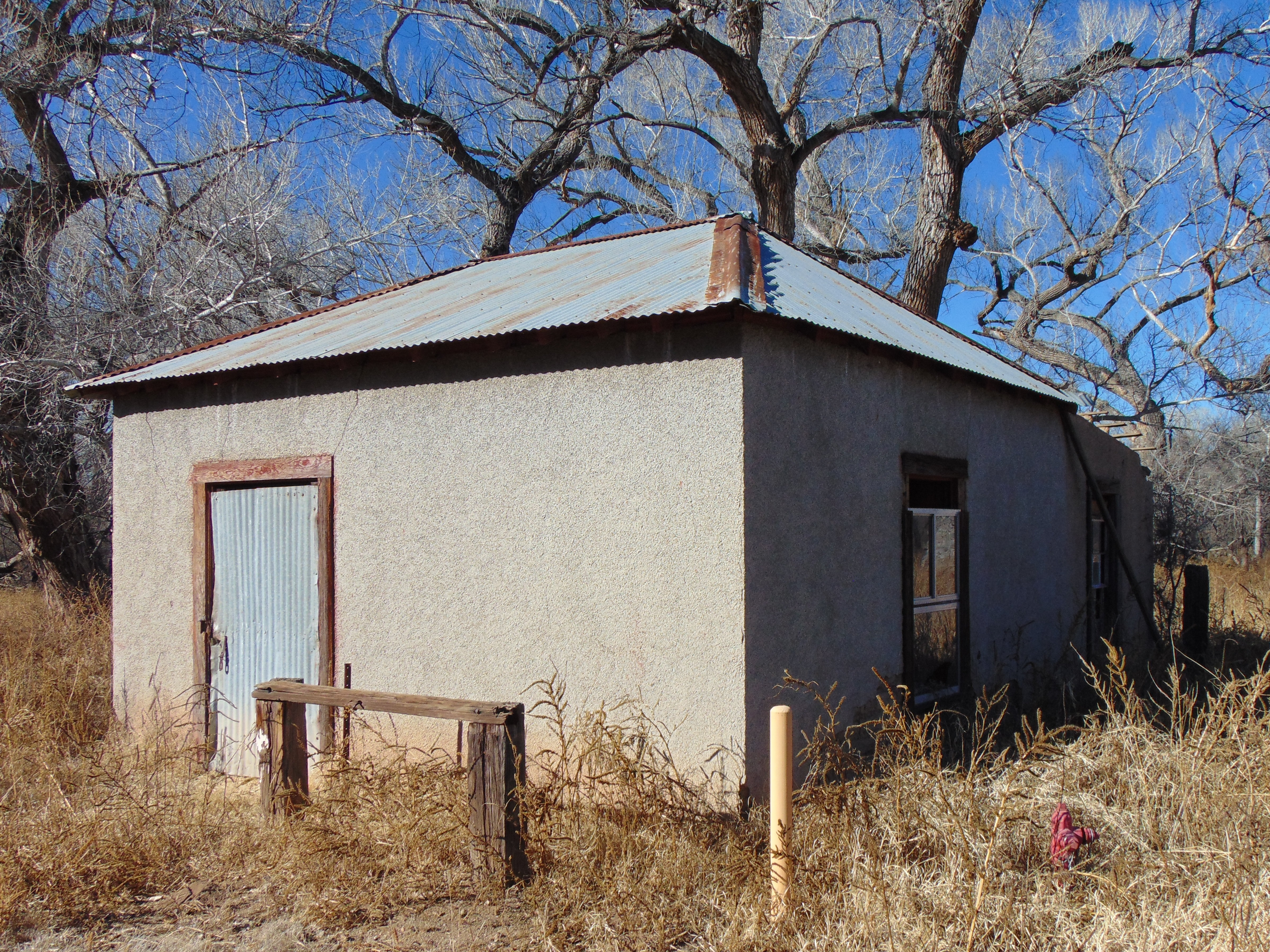
The blacksmith's shop

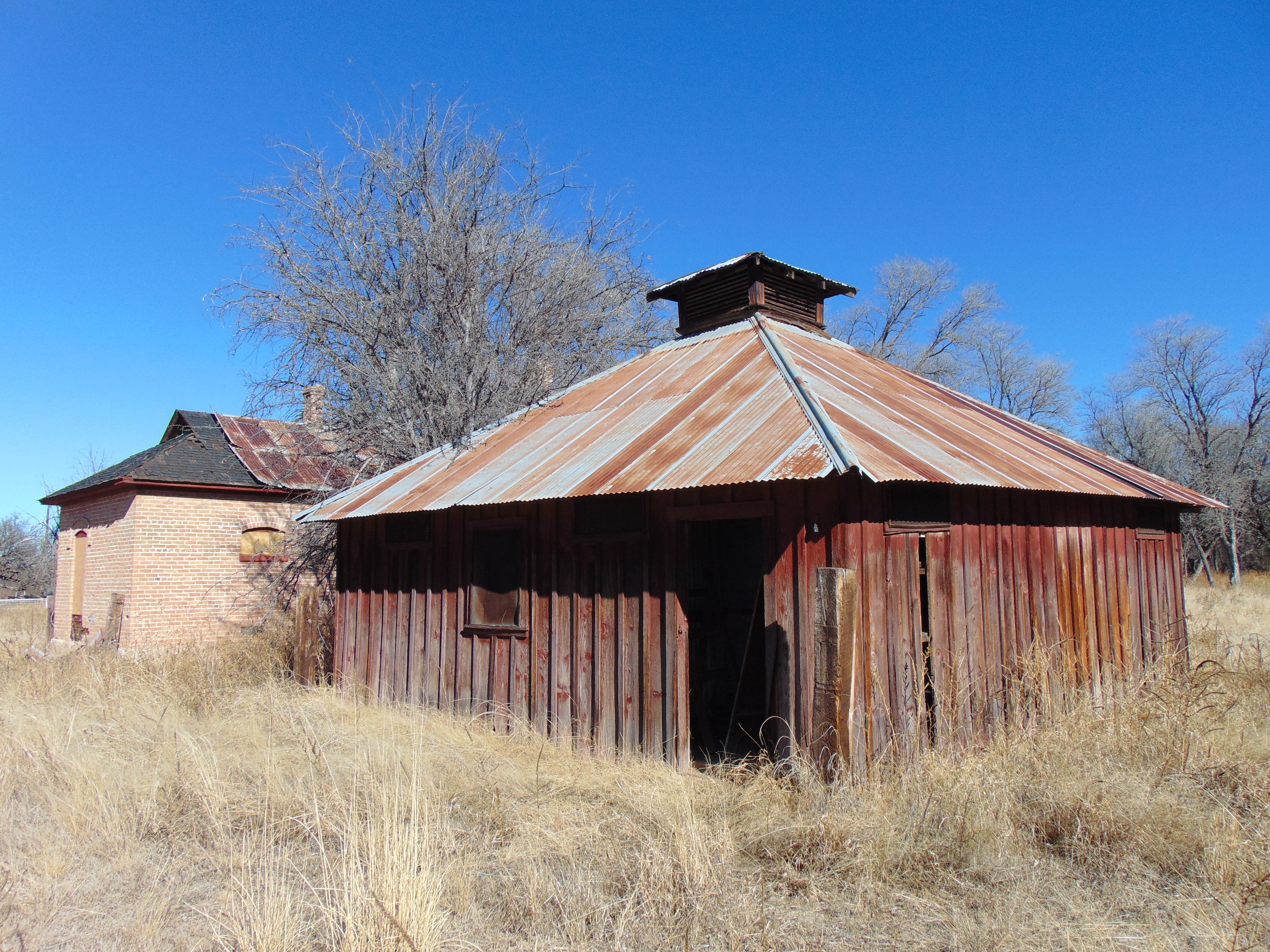
Smokehouse

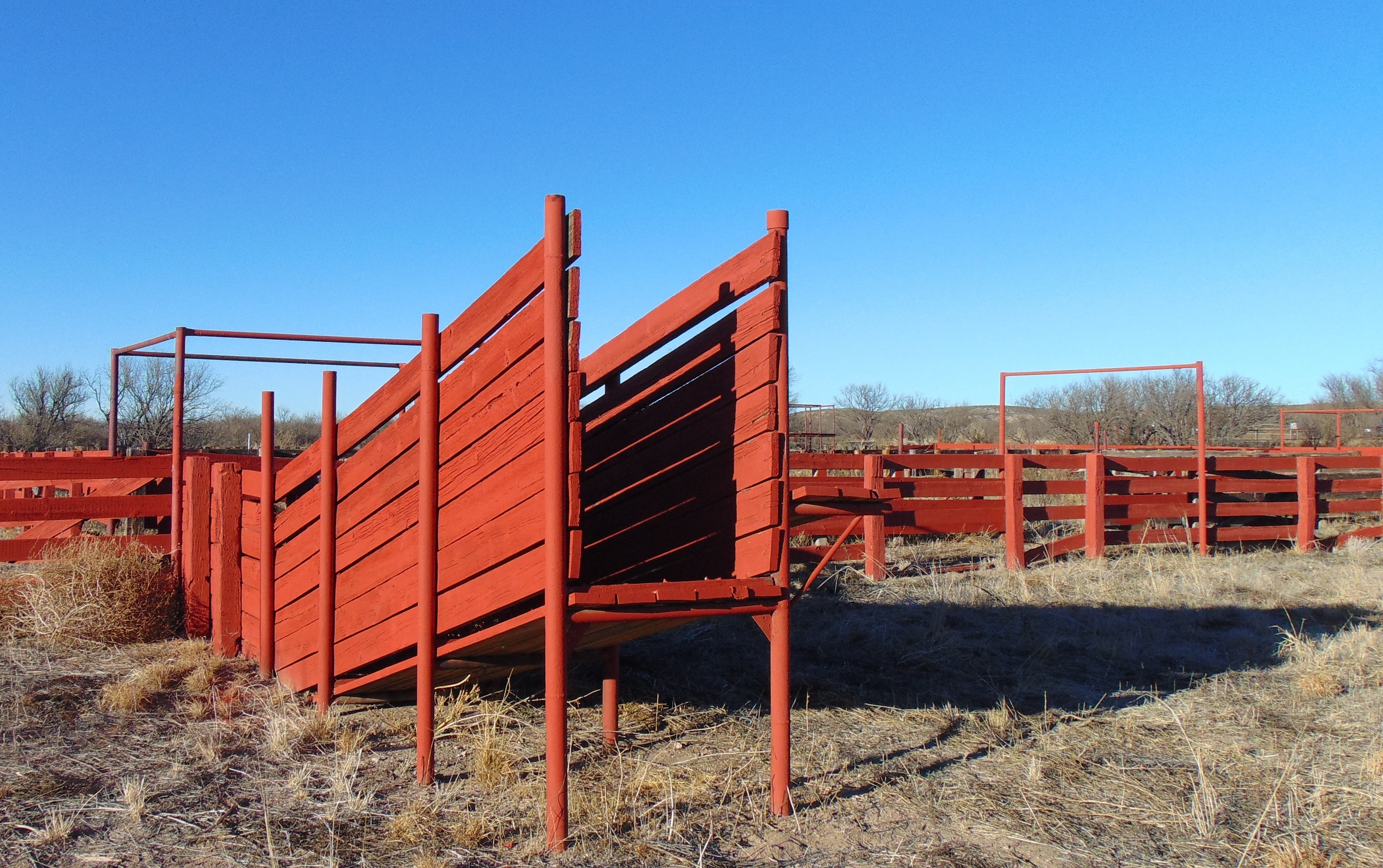
The corral in Fairbank

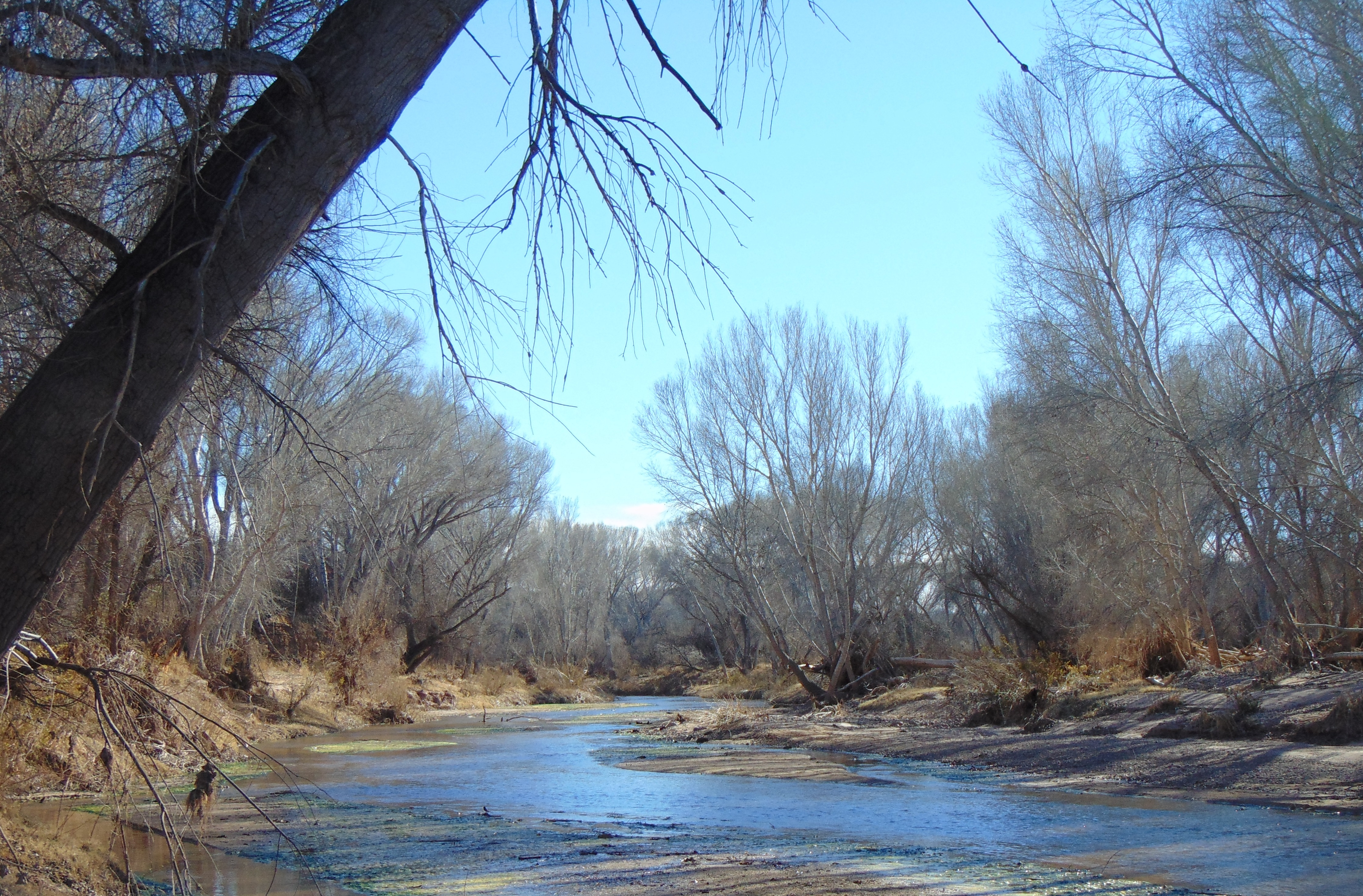
San Pedro River

== See also ==
- Brown Canyon Ranch – in Cochise County
- Faraway Ranch Historic District – in Cochise County
- San Bernardino Ranch – historic ranch in Cochise County
- Empire Ranch – historic working cattle ranch in Pima County
