= Brown Canyon Ranch =

Historic Arizona ranch

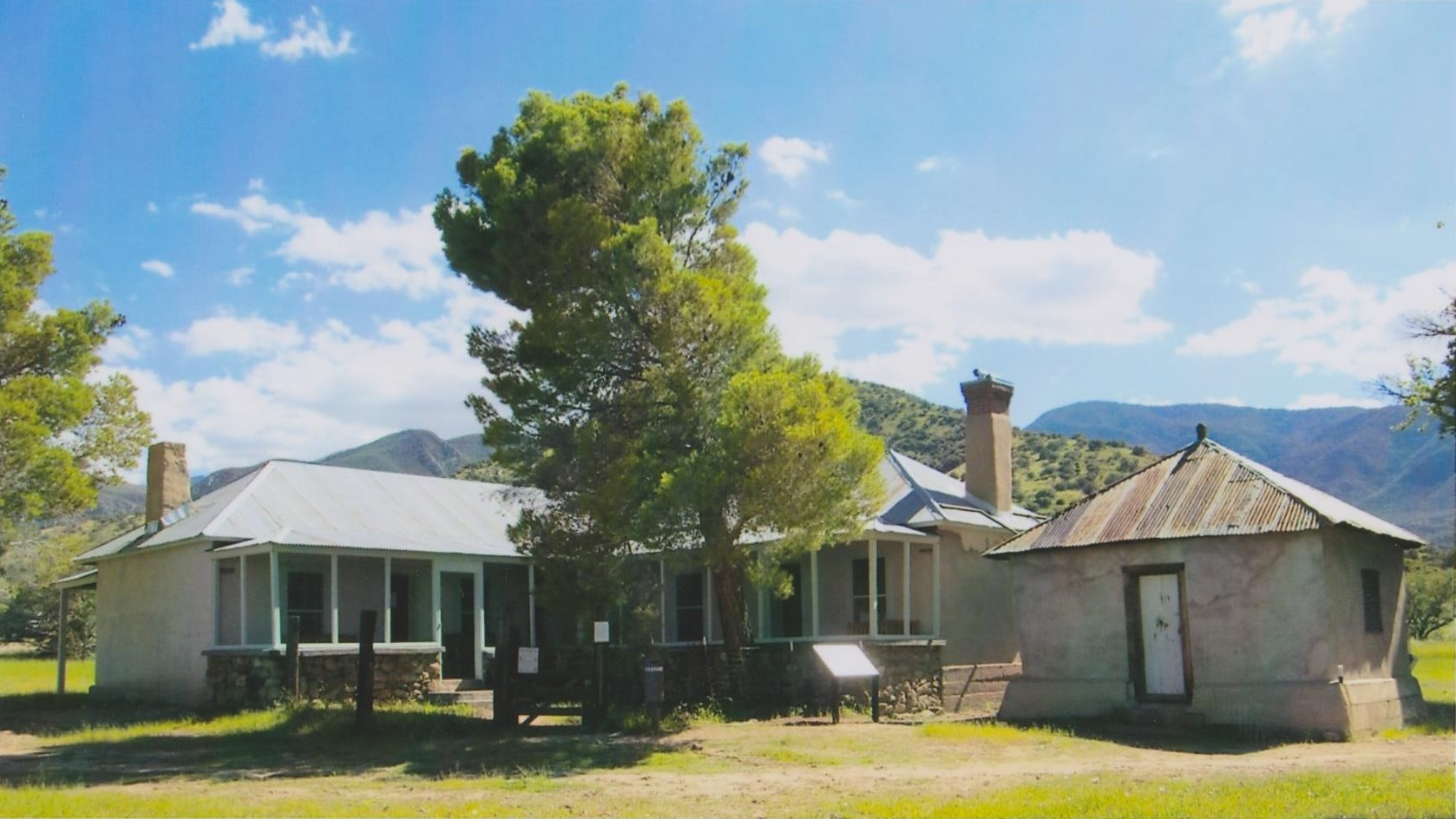
- The Brown Canyon Ranch House in 2014.

- Location within Arizona
- Former names: Barchas Ranch

General information
- Location: Huachuca Mountains, Arizona, United States
- Coordinates: 31°28′26″N 110°17′53″W
- Completed: 1907

Website
- www.browncanyonranch.org

References
- GNIS data for Barchas Ranch

Brown Canyon Ranch, formerly known as the Barchas Ranch, is a historic ranch located in the foothills of the Huachuca Mountains, near Sierra Vista, Arizona.

== History ==
The land Brown Canyon Ranch is on was first settled around 1880 by John Thomas Brown, who owned a hotel a few miles away in neighboring Ramsey Canyon. Following a succession of owners, the land eventually ended up in the hands of the brothers James and Tom Haverty. Between 1905 and 1907, James and his brother built what is today the most prominent building in the canyon, a modest three-room adobe home, now known as the Brown Canyon Ranch House. James and his wife Lessie homesteaded the ranch in 1912 and lived there until 1921, when it was sold to William and Margaret Carmichael.

The Carmichaels were major landowners in the Sierra Vista area and did not take up residence at the house. Instead, they rented it out to a local miner named Harvey James and later a Yaqui Indian named Chico Romero and his family. In 1946, the Carmichaels sold the ranch to Roy and Stella Rambo, who raised cattle on it until 1957, when it was again sold to Samuel and Cecile Barchas. The Barchas family did not live on the ranch, either, but they raised livestock on it all the way up until 1997. One year later it was deeded to the United States Forest Service in a land exchange.

Efforts to preserve and restore the historic ranch house, as well as its associated outbuildings, has been underway since 1998. In addition to the ranch house, there is also a one-room adobe storeroom adjacent to the house, a wooden corral and outhouse, the stone ruins of a barn, and a pair of man-made ponds, which are now used as a preserve for the endangered Chiricahua leopard frog. Further up the trail is a small graveyard known as the Brown Canyon Cemetery, followed by the ruins of an old house and the remains of the Pomono Mine. The ranch is open to hikers and picnickers, free of charge, for day use only.

== Buildings and remnants ==
There are several historic buildings and other remnants at the Brown Canyon Ranch, including the following:

- Ranch House: Adobe L-shaped building with a tin hipped roof, including a main living room, a kitchen in the center, and a bedroom
- Storeroom: One-room adobe building with a tin roof, adjacent to the bedroom of the ranch house
- Barn: Stone building in ruins
- Outhouse: Attached to the corral
- Corral: Wooden structure
- Windmill: Attached to a small water tank, now used as a preserve for the Chircahua leopard frog
- Frog ponds: Two man-made ponds now used as a preserve for the Chiricahua leopard frog
- Old house: Ruins up the trail from the ranch house
- Brown Canyon Cemetery: A small graveyard near the ruins of the old house
- Pomono Mine: former mining operation from the early 20th century

== Photo gallery ==
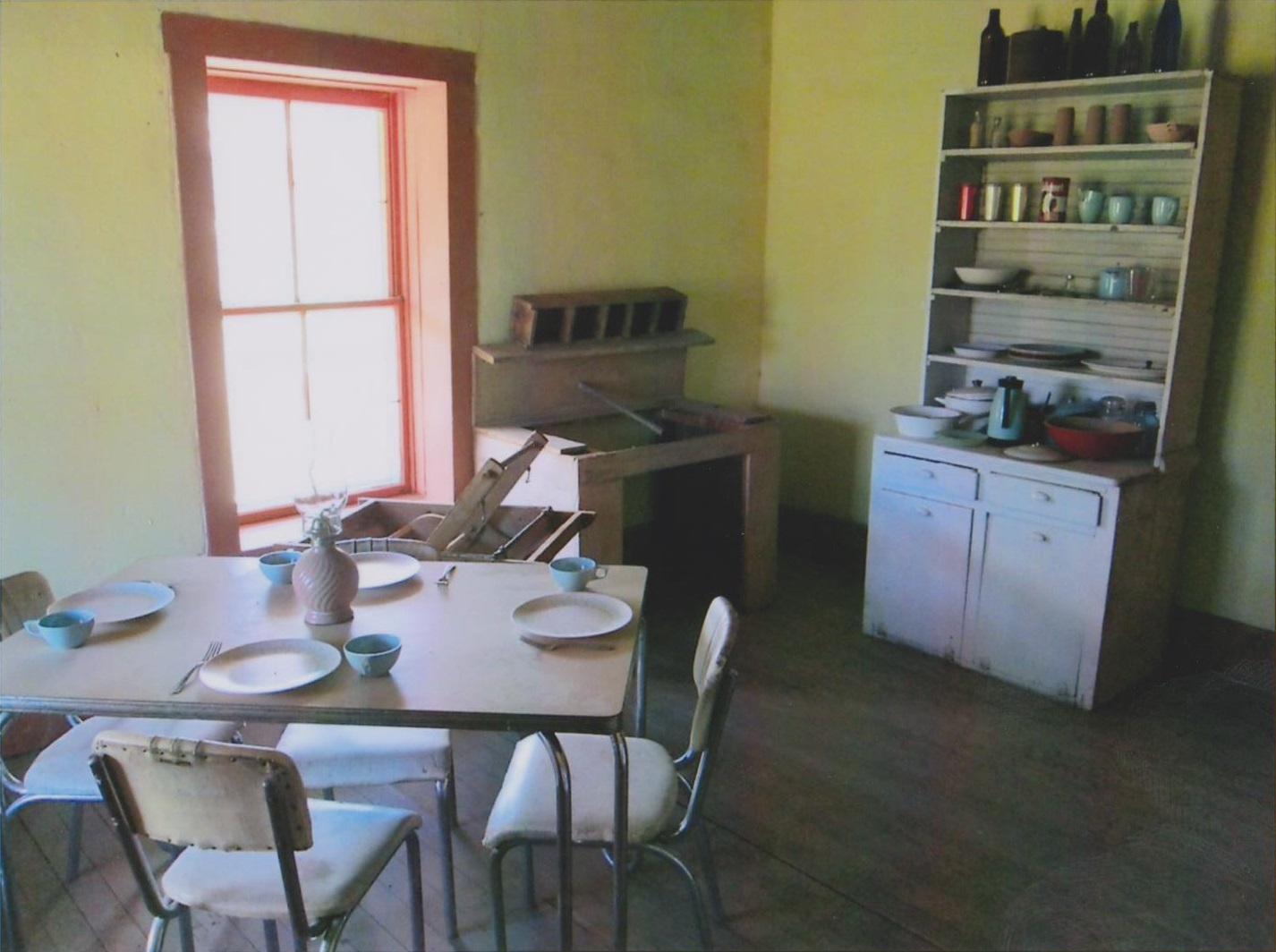
The kitchen inside the Brown Canyon Ranch House.

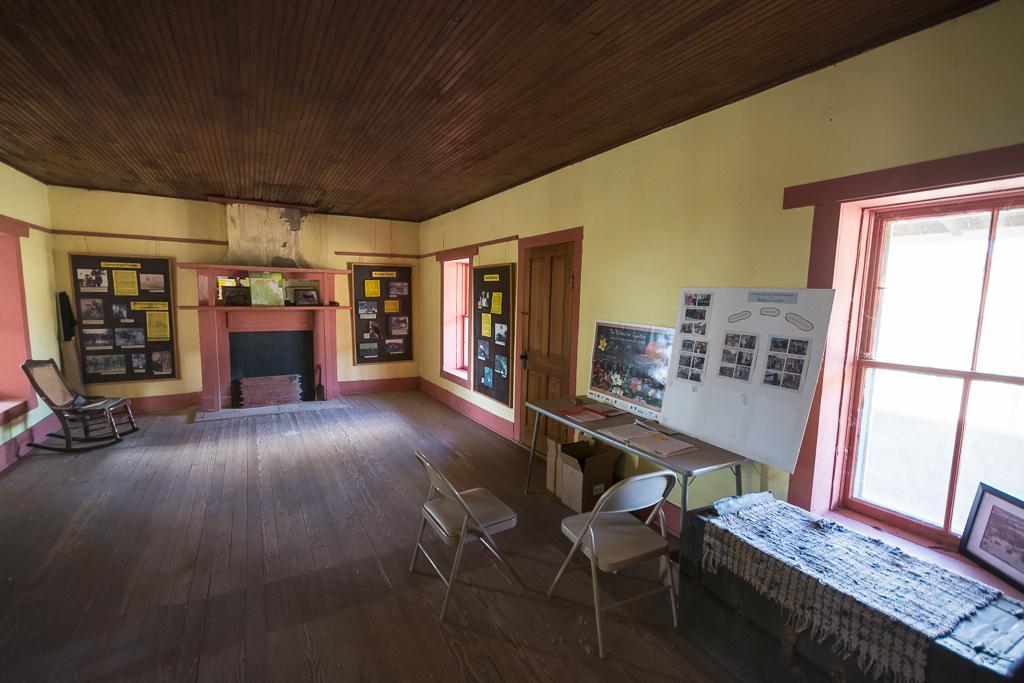
The living room.

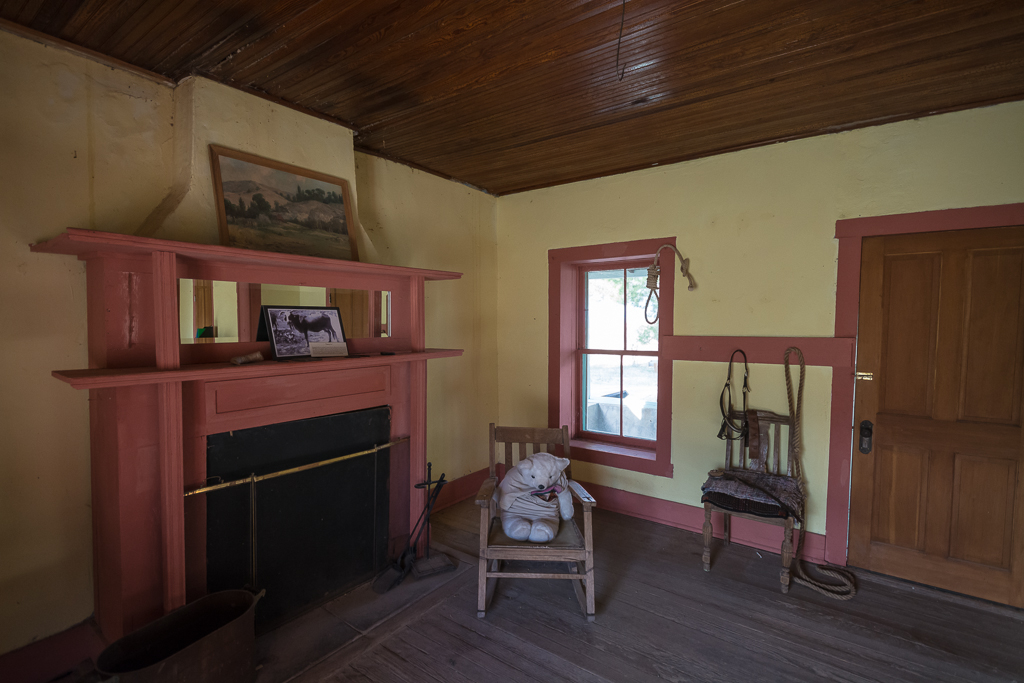
The bedroom.

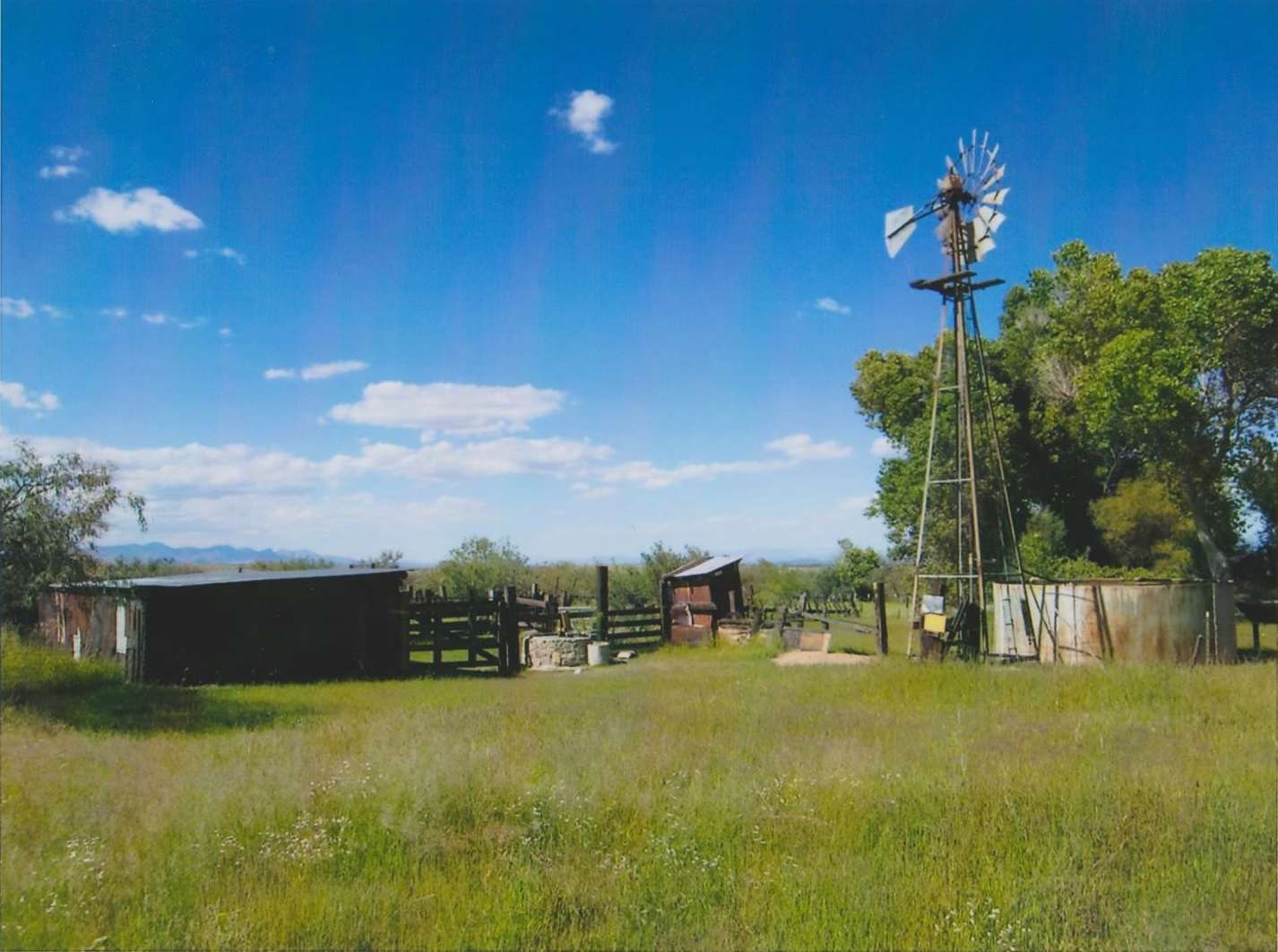
The corral, an outhouse and a windmill attached to the water tank.

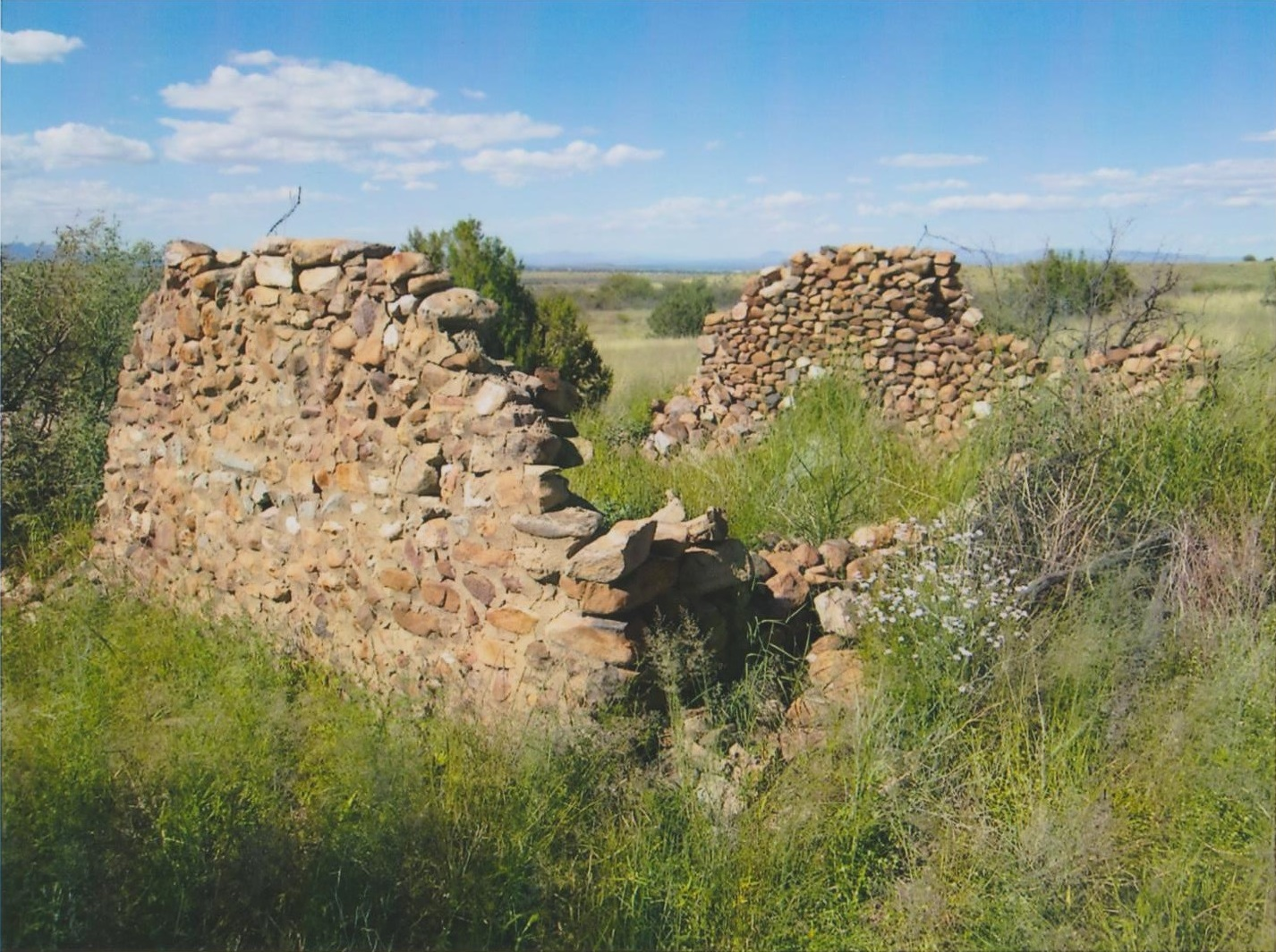
Ruins of the barn.

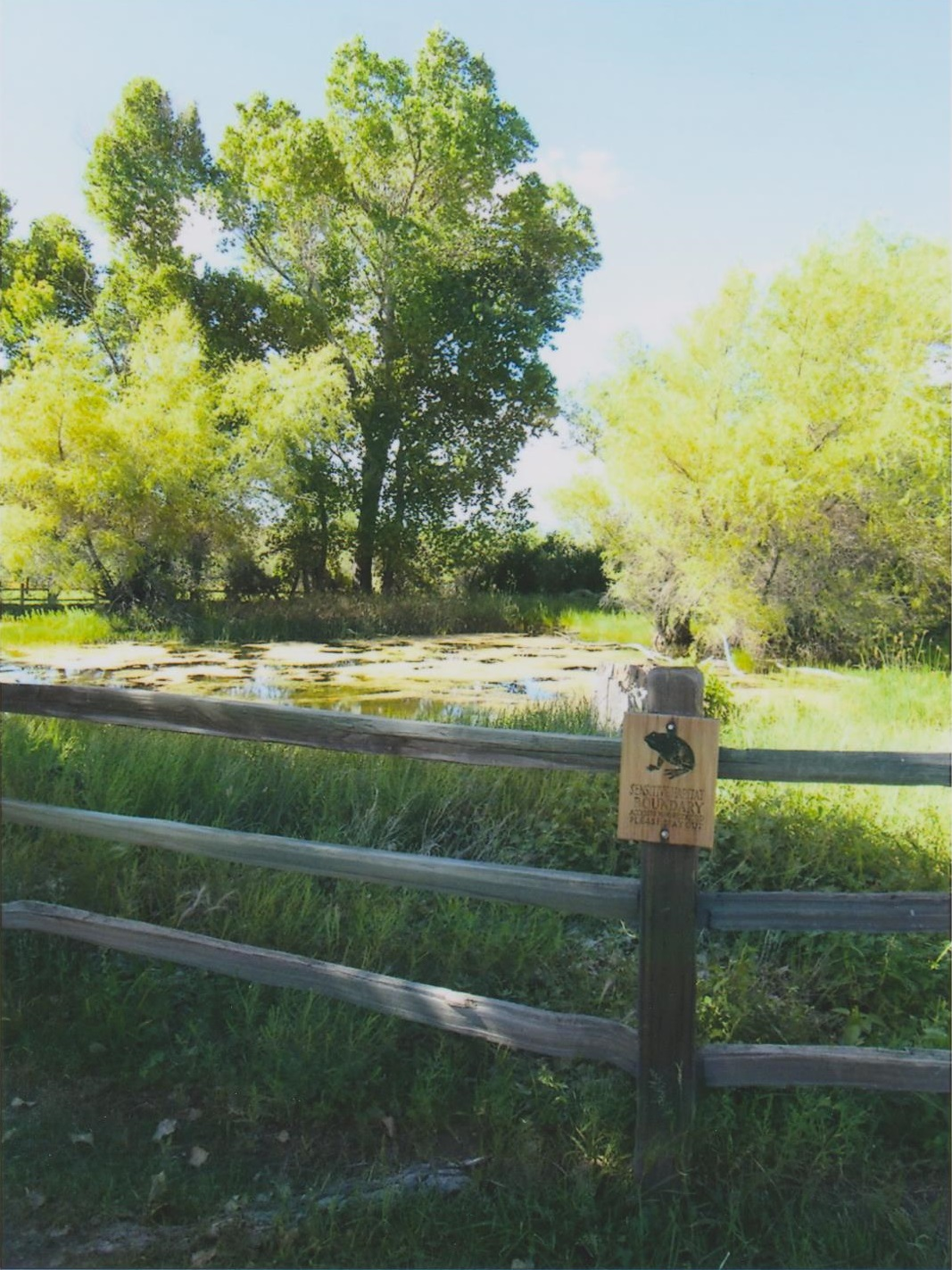
One of the frog ponds.

== See also ==
- Little Boquillas Ranch
- Faraway Ranch Historic District
- San Bernardino Ranch
- San Rafael Ranch
- Empire Ranch
