= San Pedro Riparian National Conservation Area =

Protected area in Cochise County, Arizona

- IUCN category V (protected landscape/seascape)
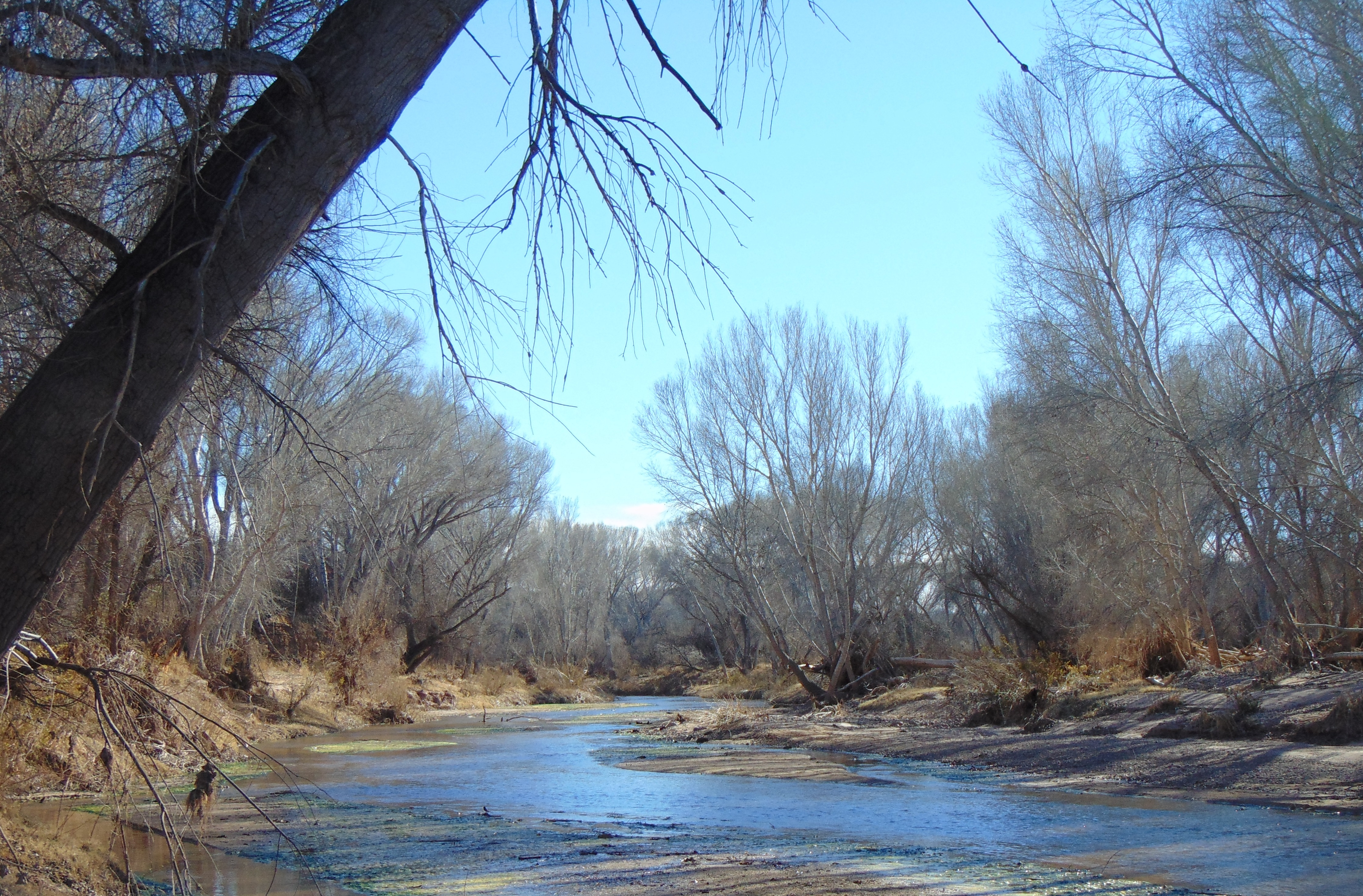
- San Pedro River at the Little Boquillas Ranch.

- Location within the United States
- Location: Cochise County, Arizona, United States
- Nearest city: Sierra Vista, Arizona
- Coordinates: 31°34′58″N 110°07′53″W
- Area: 57,000 acres (23,000 ha)
- Established: 1988
- Governing body: Bureau of Land Management
- Website: www.blm.gov/national-conservation-lands/arizona/san-pedro

The San Pedro Riparian National Conservation Area (San Pedro Riparian NCA; SPRNCA) contains nearly 57,000 acres (23,000 ha) of public land in Cochise County, Arizona, between the international border with Mexico and St. David, Arizona. The riparian area, where some 40 miles (64 km) of the upper San Pedro River meanders, was, through the efforts of congressman Jim Kolbe, designated by Congress as a Riparian National Conservation Area on November 18, 1988, and assigned to the protection of the U.S. Bureau of Land Management (BLM).

One of the most important riparian areas in the United States, the San Pedro River runs through the Chihuahuan and Sonoran Desert transition zone in southeastern Arizona. The river's stretch in the southern San Pedro Valley is home to 84 species of mammals, 14 species of fish, 41 species of reptiles and amphibians, and 100 species of breeding birds. It also provides invaluable habitat for 250 species of migrant and wintering birds and contains archaeological sites representing the remains of human occupation from 13,000 years ago.

In addition to protecting the San Pedro River's rare ecosystem for future generations, the BLM also works to stabilize and preserve several historic buildings and structures located throughout much of the San Pedro Riparian NCA, including those of the Fairbank Historic Townsite, the Little Boquillas Ranch and the San Pedro House. The San Pedro House is located along the river to the east of Sierra Vista and is a fully restored historic ranch house dating to the 1930s. It is now used as a visitor center and bookstore for the San Pedro Riparian NCA.

In April 2022, the San Pedro River was named as one of America's Most Endangered Rivers. Later in 2022, environmental protection groups, including the Center for Biological Diversity, the Western Watersheds project and the Sierra Club challenged the BLM’s proposal to expand livestock grazing in the protected area. In a lawsuit, they questioned whether cattle grazing was compatible with protecting against excess erosion and protecting the indigenous wildlife.

== Gallery ==
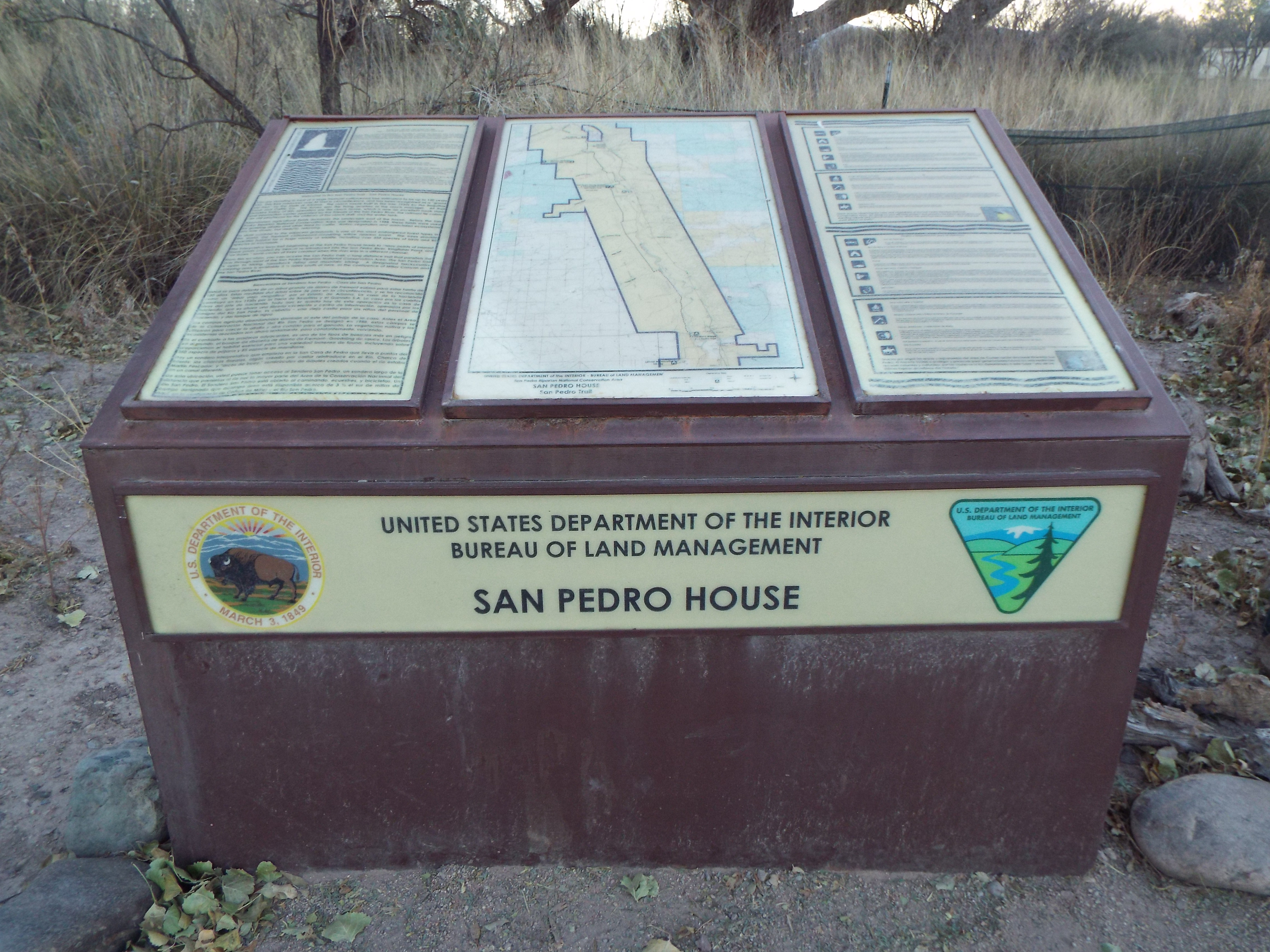
San Pedro Riparian National Conservation Area

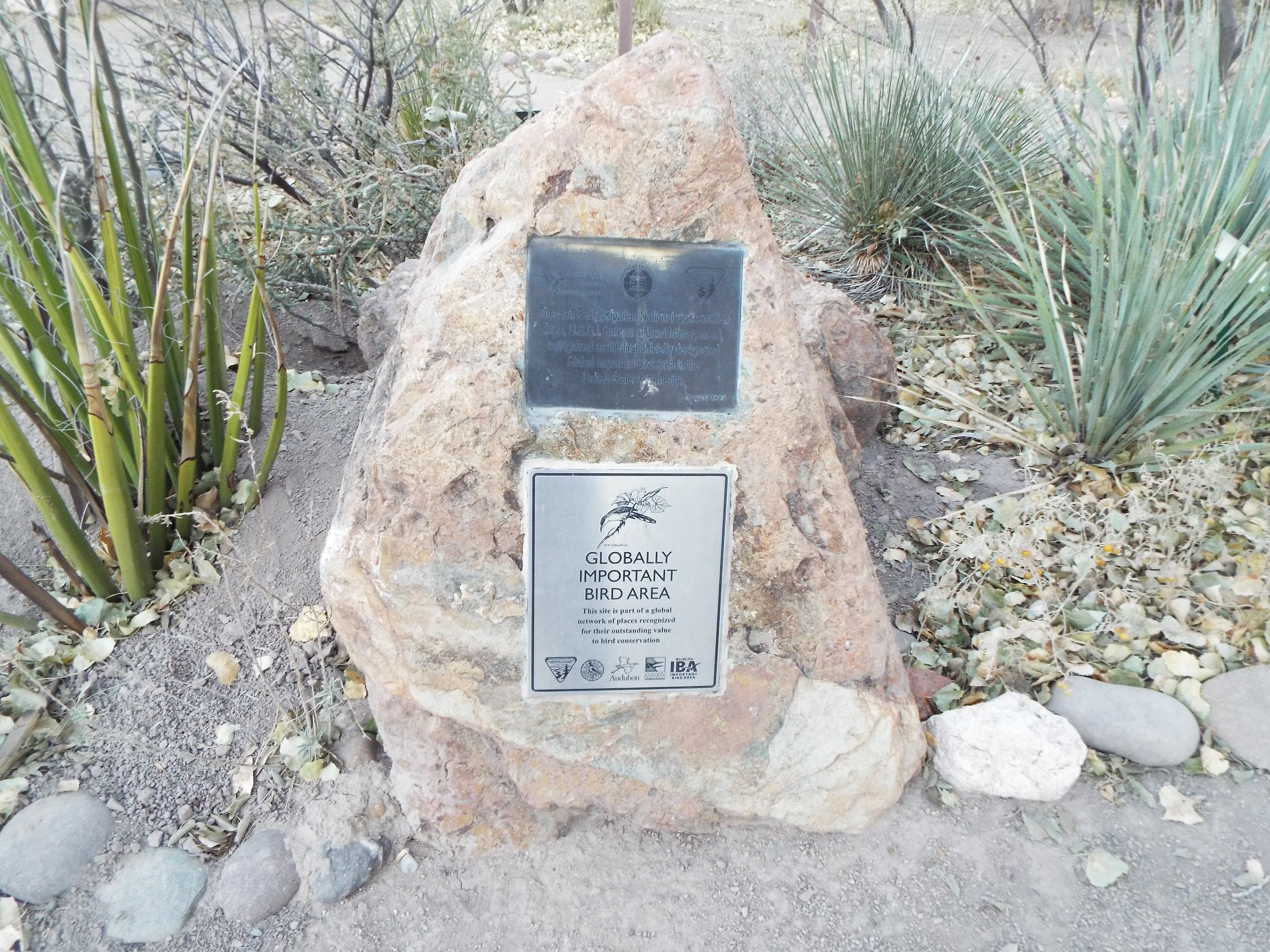
San Pedro Riparian National Conservation Area Globally Important Bird Area

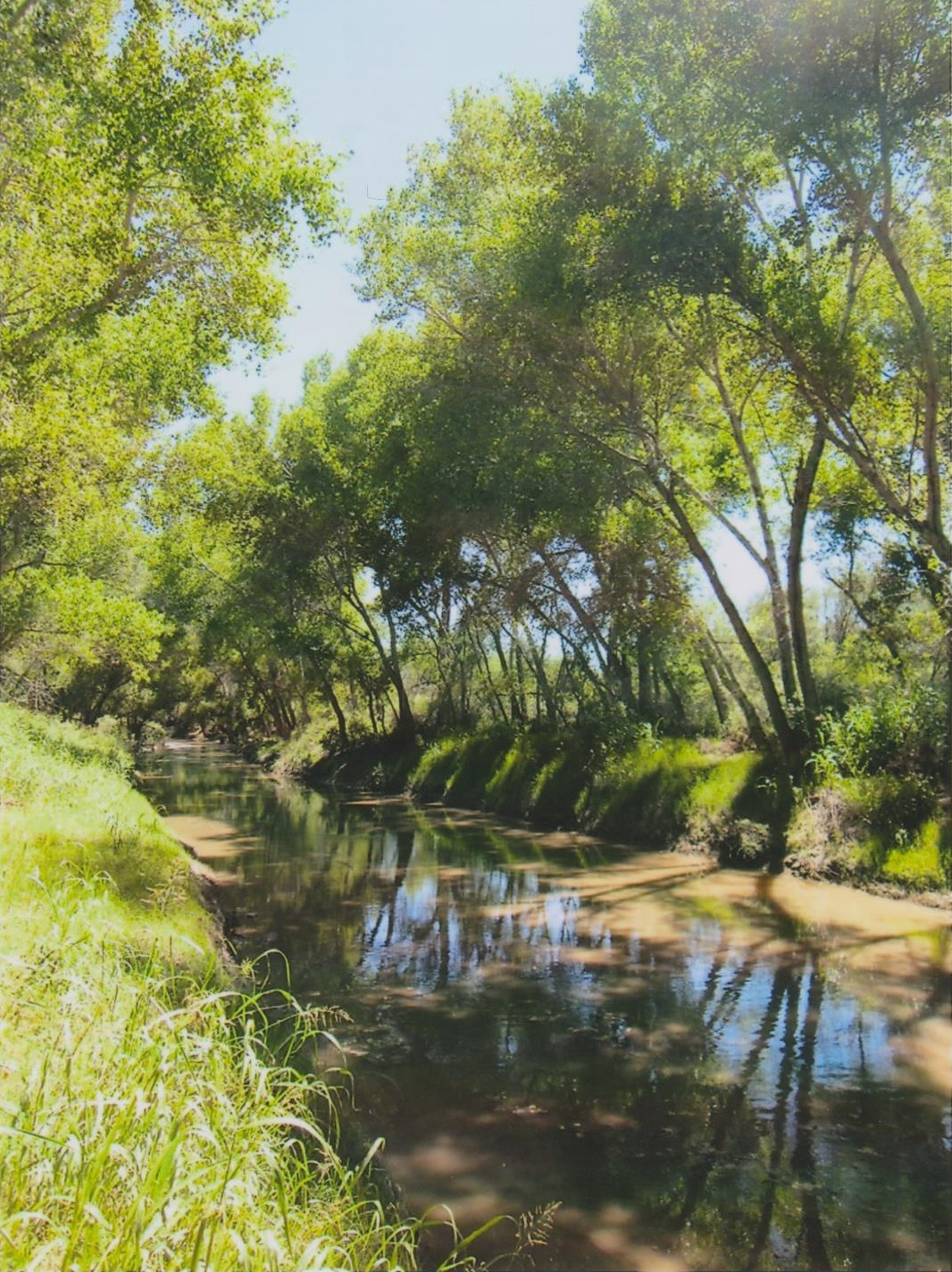
The San Pedro River in Palominas, Arizona, bright green after the summer monsoon.

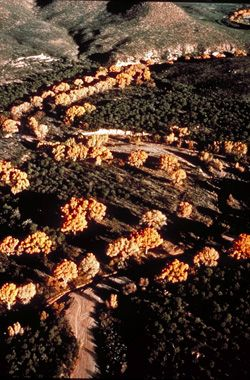
Fall colors in the San Pedro Riparian NCA.

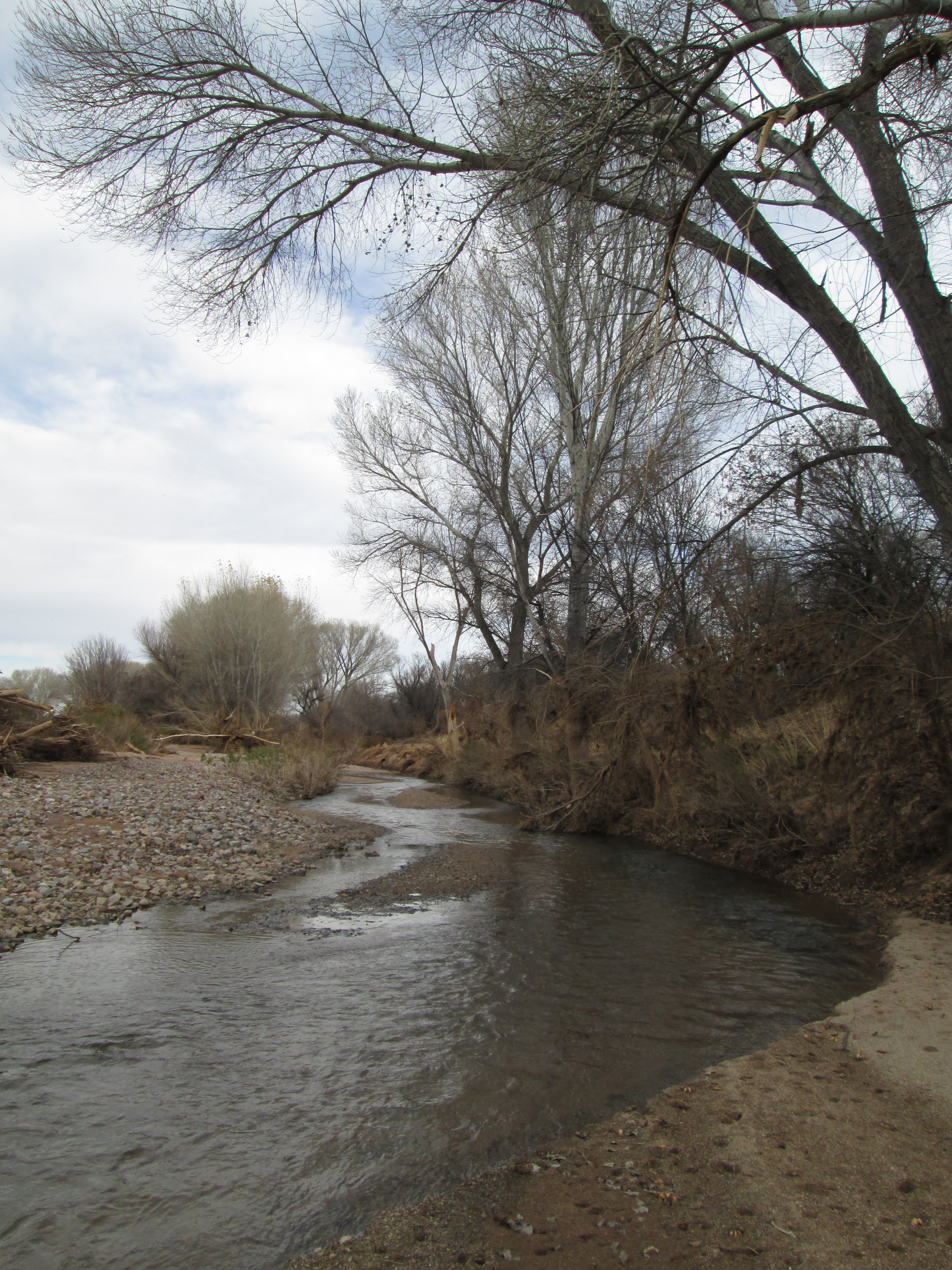
The San Pedro, near the old railroad bridge in Fairbank.

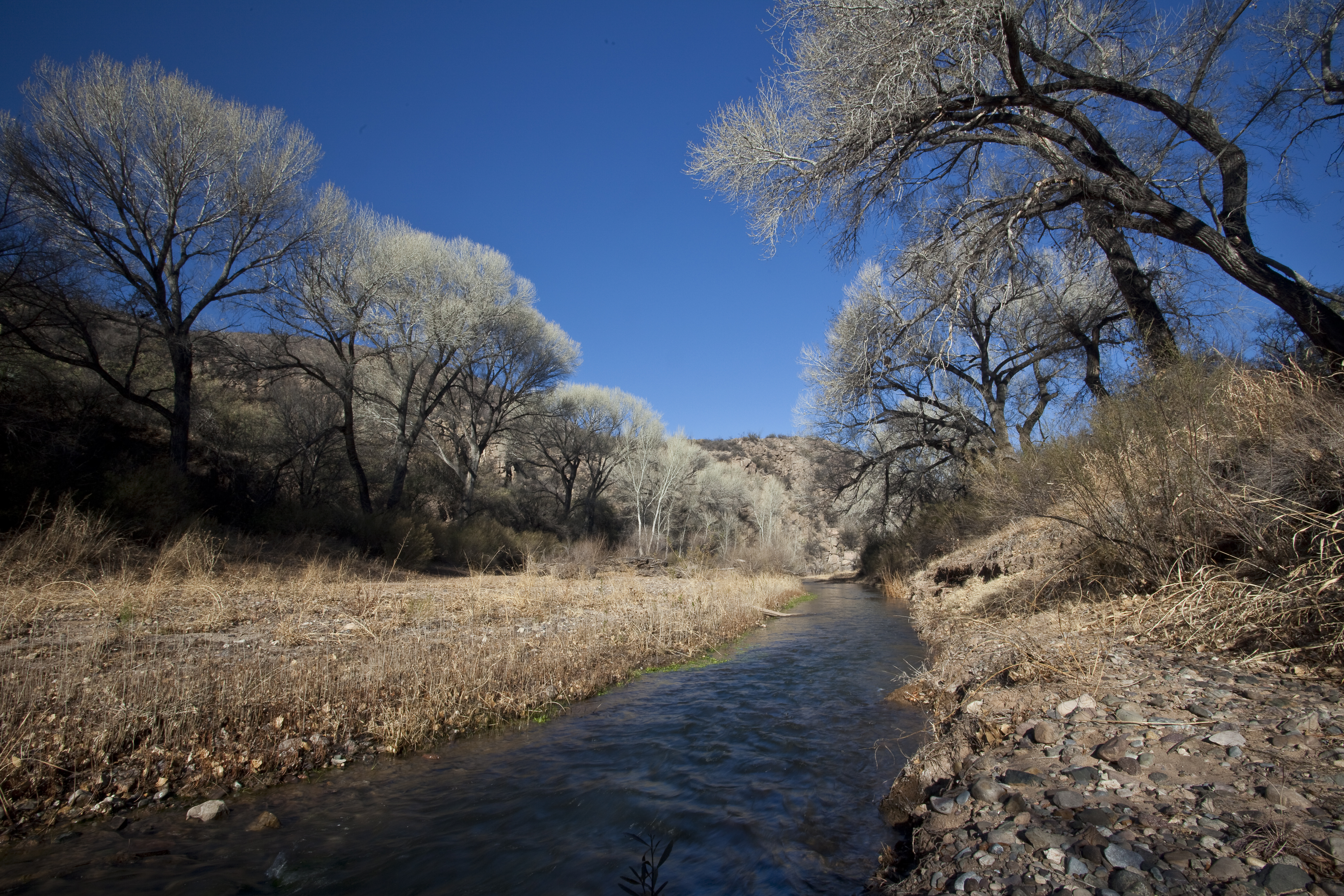
The San Pedro in 2010.

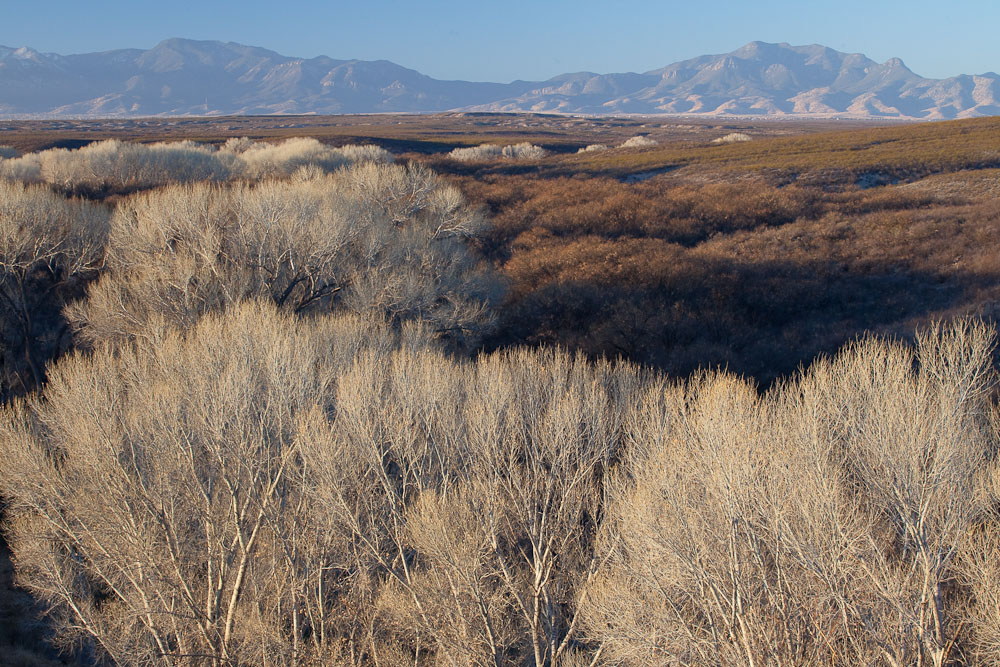
Riparian forest

== See also ==
- Las Cienegas National Conservation Area
- Riparian-zone restoration
