= San Rafael Ranch =

- U.S. National Register of Historic Places
- U.S. Historic district
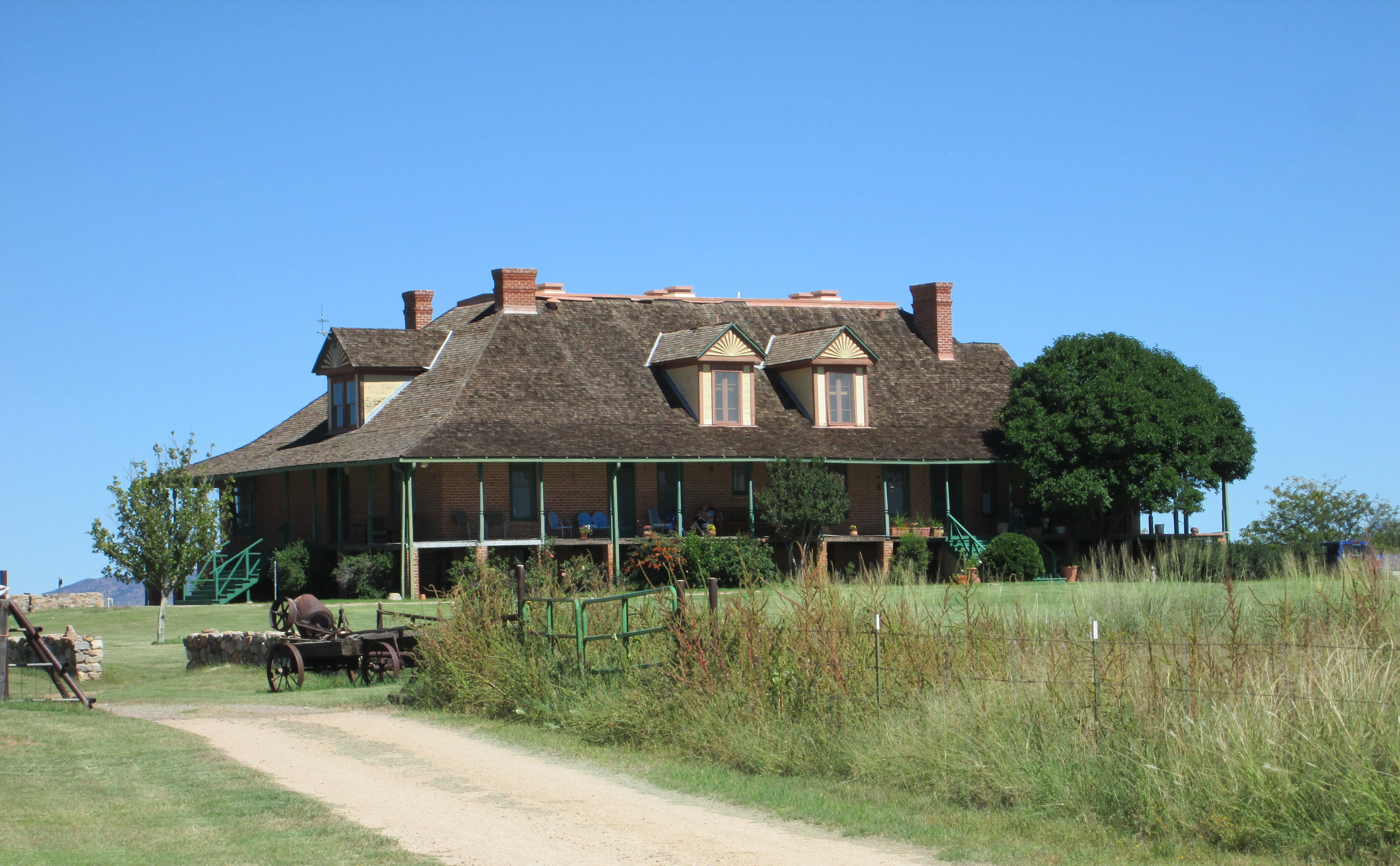
- The San Rafael Ranch House in 2014

- Location within Arizona
- Location: Lochiel, Arizona, US
- Coordinates: 31°21′13.71″N 110°36′47.30″W
- Built: 1884
- MPS: Cattle Ranching in Arizona MPS
- NRHP reference No.: 08000001
- Added to NRHP: 2008

The San Rafael Ranch, formerly known as the Greene Ranch, is a historic cattle ranch located in the San Rafael Valley about a mile and a half north of Lochiel, Arizona, United States near the international border with Sonora, Mexico.

== History ==
The San Rafael Ranch was a Mexican land grant called San Rafael de la Zanja, which was sold to the cattle baron Colin Cameron and a few of his partners in the 1880s. Cameron built a two-story house to live in soon after, but it burned to the ground Christmas Eve when it caught fire from a candle Christmas tree in 1899. A year later Cameron built a three-story brick house, even larger and more luxurious than the original and lived in it for a short time. After losing a legal battle to his neighbor over land rights in 1903, Cameron decided the ranch was not worth the trouble and sold it to his rival. Colonel William Cornell Greene, who owned the large copper mines to the southeast, in Cananea, Sonora. Colonel Greene acquired many properties over the years, including some 600,000 acres (240,000 ha) of ranch land on both sides of the international border. The San Rafael Ranch House became the headquarters for the Greene Cattle Company, which raised tens-of-thousands of hereford cattle that Collin Cameron brought from New York and horses to go with them. The Greene Cattle Company was so successful it even attracted the attention of Pancho Villa, who raided the San Rafael Ranch for horses on more than one occasion in the early 1910s.

Colonel Greene died in 1911 and the ranch was inherited by his daughter, Florence Sharp, and her husband. In the early 1950s, the ranch acquired national attention when it was selected as the filming location for the classic Western film Oklahoma!, starring Gordon MacRae and Shirley Jones. Shortly thereafter, Florence Sharp and her family began the long process of having the ranch house and surrounding rangeland preserved for future generations. The ranching era finally came to an end in 1998, following the death of Florence Sharp and the sale of the ranch to The Nature Conservancy. In 1999 Arizona State Parks purchased 3,557 acres (1,439 ha) of the property, including the ranch house, for use as a Natural Area. Arizona State Parks also purchased a conservation easement on the remainder of the original ranch. The San Rafael Ranch includes 18,500 deeded acres (7,500 ha) and a grazing preference established in 1999 on the natural area held by Arizona State Parks. In 2008, the ranch headquarters was designated a National Historic District, but it is currently not open to the public.

== Historic district ==
The historic district consists of the main ranch house and several ancillary buildings including a machine/blacksmith shop, two barns, corrals, and other structures used in livestock operations. The district is significant both for the French Colonial Revival style of the ranch house, unusual for a rural ranch in Arizona; and as an example of the ranching industry in Arizona from 1884 to 1957.

== Gallery ==
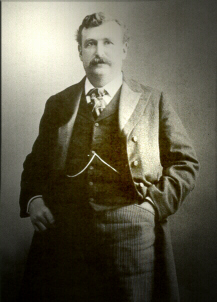
Colonel William Cornell Greene, owner of the San Rafael Ranch and the Greene Cattle Company

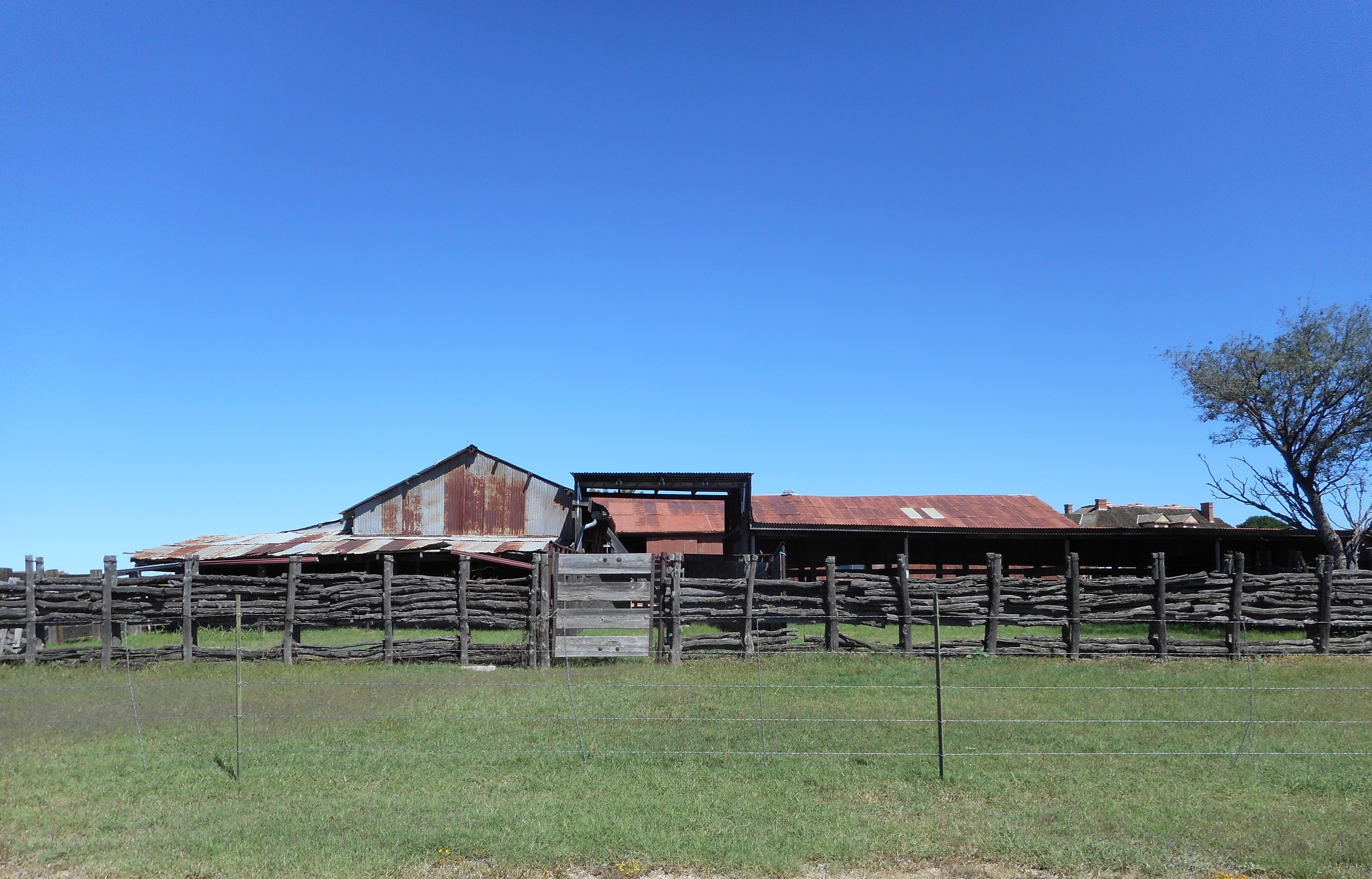
The barn and the corral next to the San Rafael Ranch House

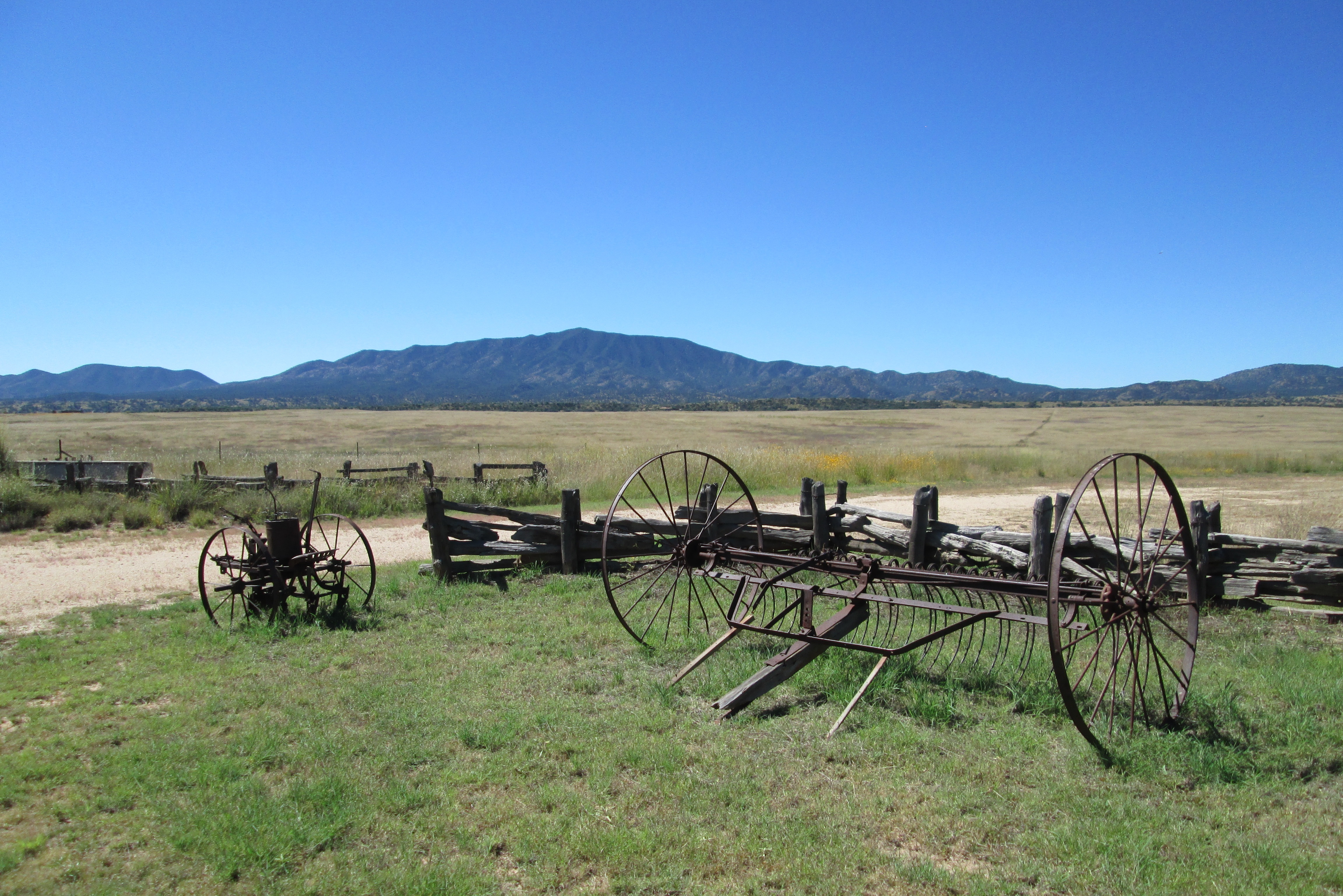
Old farm equipment

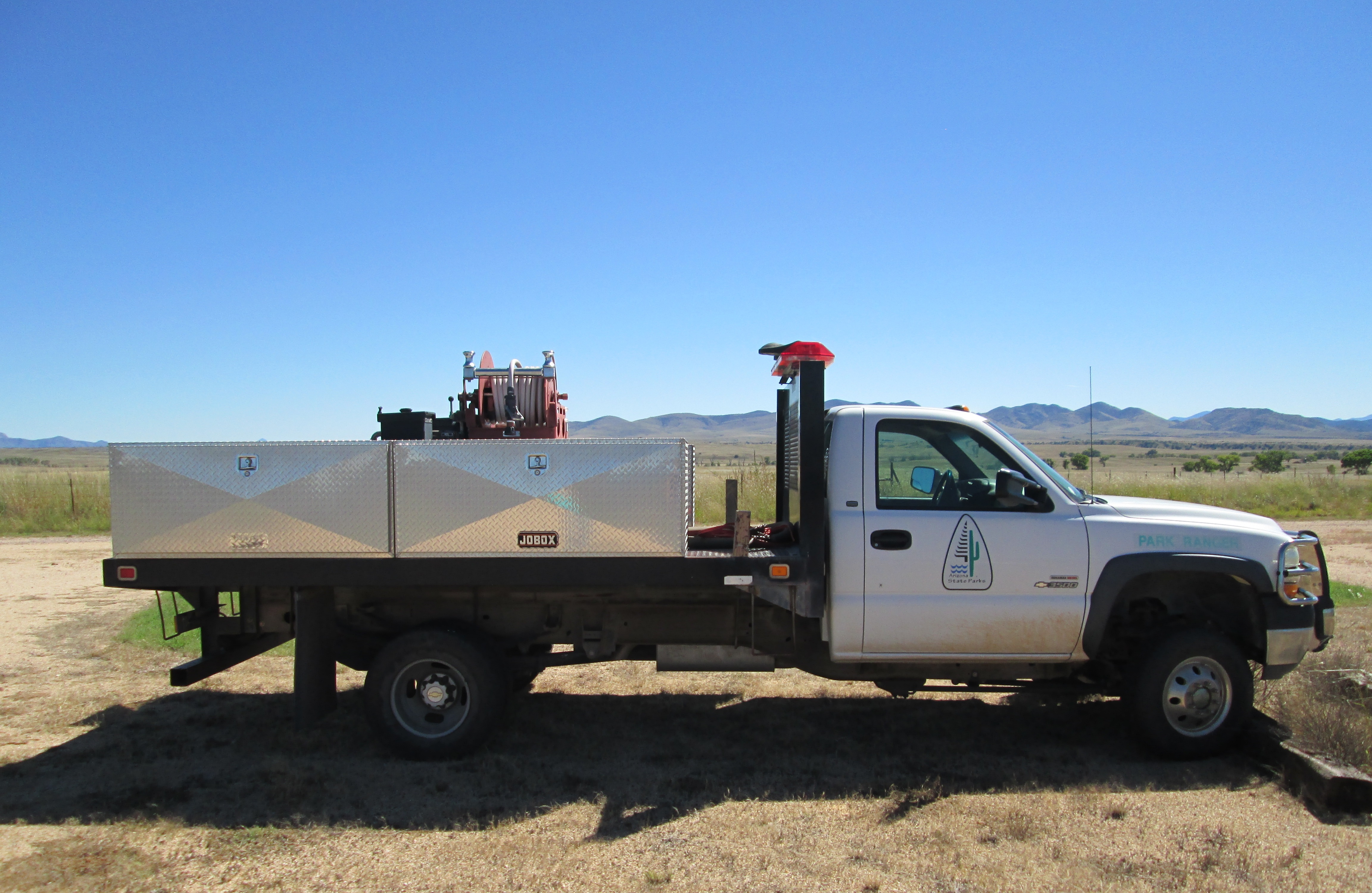
An Arizona State Parks truck

== See also ==
- Hale Ranch
- San Bernardino Ranch
- Empire Ranch
- Faraway Ranch Historic District
- Brown Canyon Ranch
- National Register of Historic Places listings in Santa Cruz County, Arizona
