= List of historic properties in Bisbee, Arizona =

- City
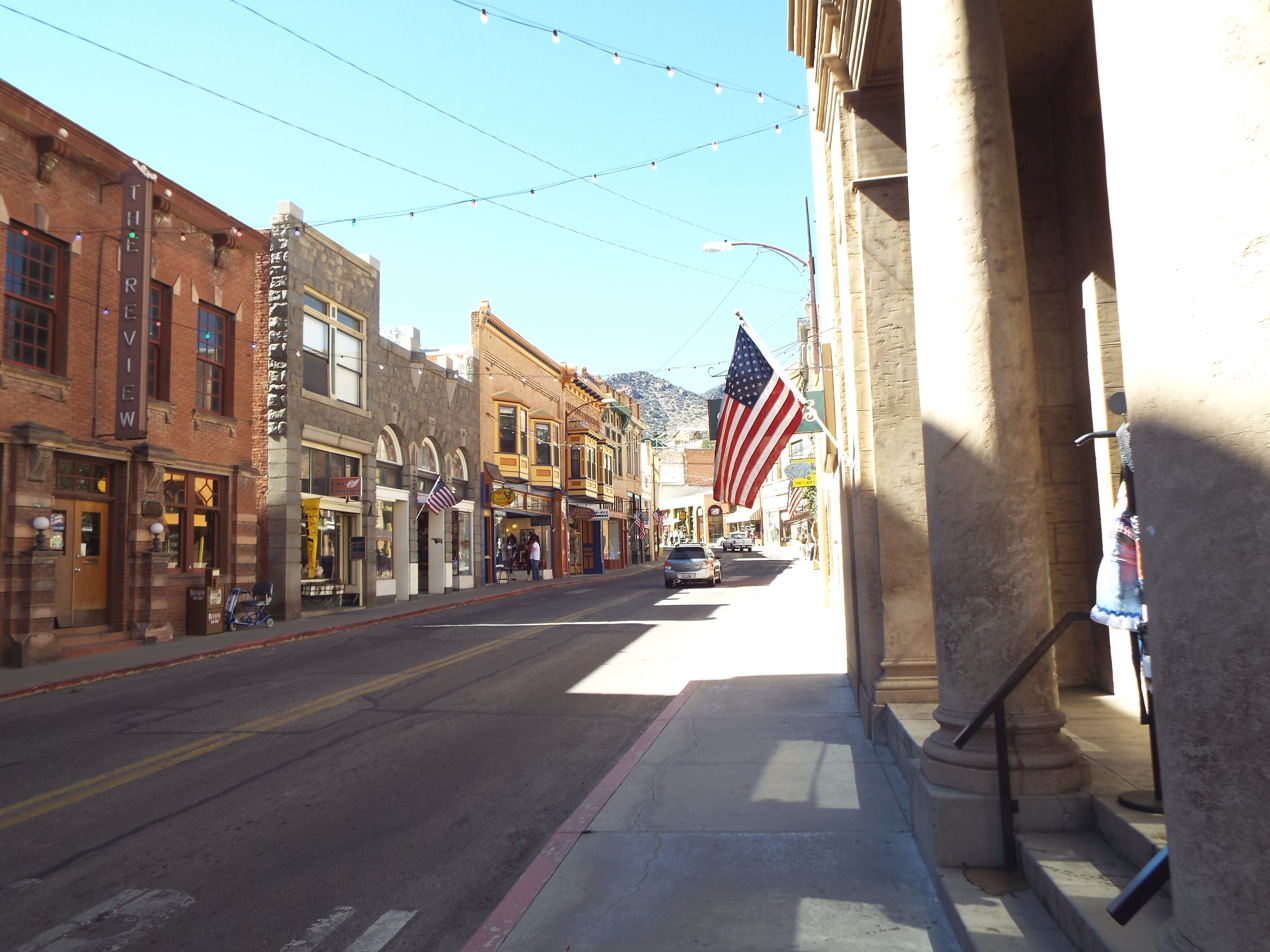
- View of Bisbee’s Main Street.

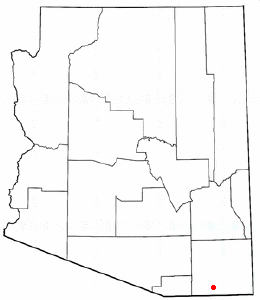
- Location in Cochise County and the state of Arizona

This is a list of historic properties in Bisbee, Arizona, which includes a photographic gallery of some of the town's historic structures. The majority of these structures are located in the Bisbee Historic District which was added to the National Register of Historic Places on July 3, 1980, reference #80004487. Others are located in the Bisbee Residential Historic District which was added to the National Register of Historic Places on October 15, 2010, reference #10000233.

Also included are the photographs of individual properties identified as historic by the National Register of Historic Places. These include the Phelps Dodge Headquarters Building, the Muheim House, the Bisbee Women's Club House, St. Patrick's Roman Catholic Church and the Walter Douglas House.

== Brief history ==
An Army Scout by the name of Jack Dunn was filling the canteens of his fellow soldiers’ on a summer day in 1877, on the twin limestone monoliths of Castle Rock, when he discovered copper ore and recorded the first mining claim in what in the near future was to be known as the town of Bisbee. Numerous prospectors and speculators headed to the mountains in Bisbee to stake claims. With the discovery of numerous ore bodies, Bisbee became known as the "Queen of the Copper Camps." Bisbee had become the largest city between St. Louis and San Francisco by the 19th century.

Dunn and his commanding officer Lt. John Rucker met a prospector by the name of George Warren. They asked Warren to file a claim for them. He agreed, but did not keep his word. Warren established what became known as the Warren Mining District. He held a one-ninth interest in the new Copper Queen mine.

== The Phelps Dodge Company ==
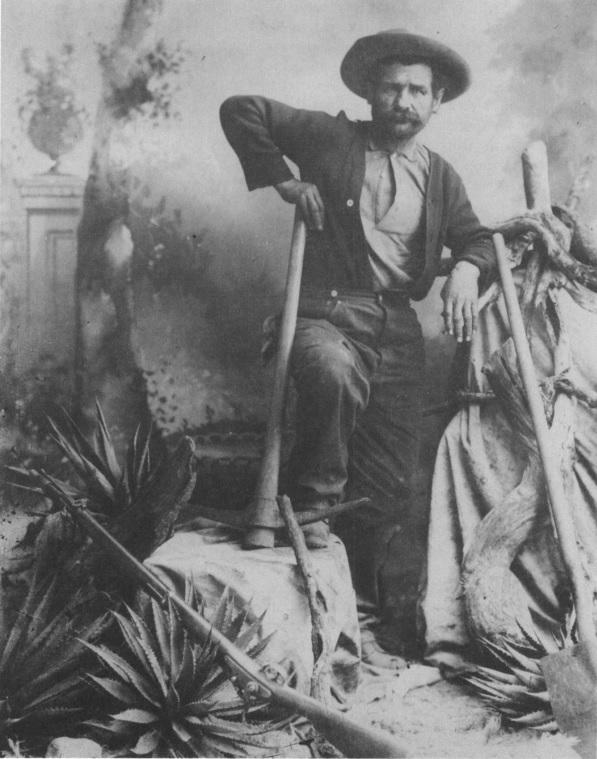
Miner George Warren

The Phelps Dodge Company of Pennsylvania sent James Douglas, the inventor of new methods of smelting copper, to examine potential copper mines.

Phelps Dodge began their mining operations in Arizona in the 1880s. Arizona mining operations at the time stuck strictly to the "rule of the apex," according to which a claim owner could follow a vein of ore onto another claim, if the deposit had come closest to the surface on his land. This had occurred with Copper Queen, and Phelps Dodge, rather than risk losing this strike to the Copper Queen owners, purchased the Copper Queen mine, merging it with the Atlanta claim.

In 1896, the company established its headquarters in what is known as the Phelps Dodge Headquarters Building located at 5 Copper Queen Plaza. Under the guidance of Copper Queen President James Douglas, the parent corporation had initiated a number of programs for Bisbee miners. Among the historic structures which were built by the Phelps Dodge Mining Co. for its employees was the Copper Queen Hospital, the Copper Queen Library and Bisbee Post Office Building, the Phelps Dodge Clinic (now known as the Bisbee Review Building) and the Bisbee Gym Building.

The company also established the Copper Queen Hotel in 1902 and in that same year sold the deed to the land for 1 dollar where the Presbyterian Church was built. Frederick C. Hurst, an architect for the Copper Queen Mining Co., designed many of the buildings in Bisbee. These included the Bisbee Opera House, Central School and the Old Bisbee Fire Hall/City Hall which is pictured.

One of the buildings (The Letson Loft Hotel) located in the Bisbee Historic District was where the Goldwater-Castaneda Mercantile Store was originally located. This is where a gunfight, known as the infamous "Bisbee Massacre, between a gang of thieves and the citizens of Bisbee occurred on December 8, 1883.

== Arizona Preservation Foundation ==
In 2012, the Arizona Preservation Foundation listed the Courthouse Plaza Miners’ Monument in Bisbee as endangered. The fact that a property is listed in the National Register of Historic Places does not guarantee that the owner of the same will not have the property demolished. Unfortunately many of the historic sites are in grave danger of collapsing or destruction. According to Jim McPherson, Arizona Preservation Foundation Board President: "It is crucial that residents, private interests, and government officials act now to save these elements of our cultural heritage before it is too late.”

== Historic Structures ==
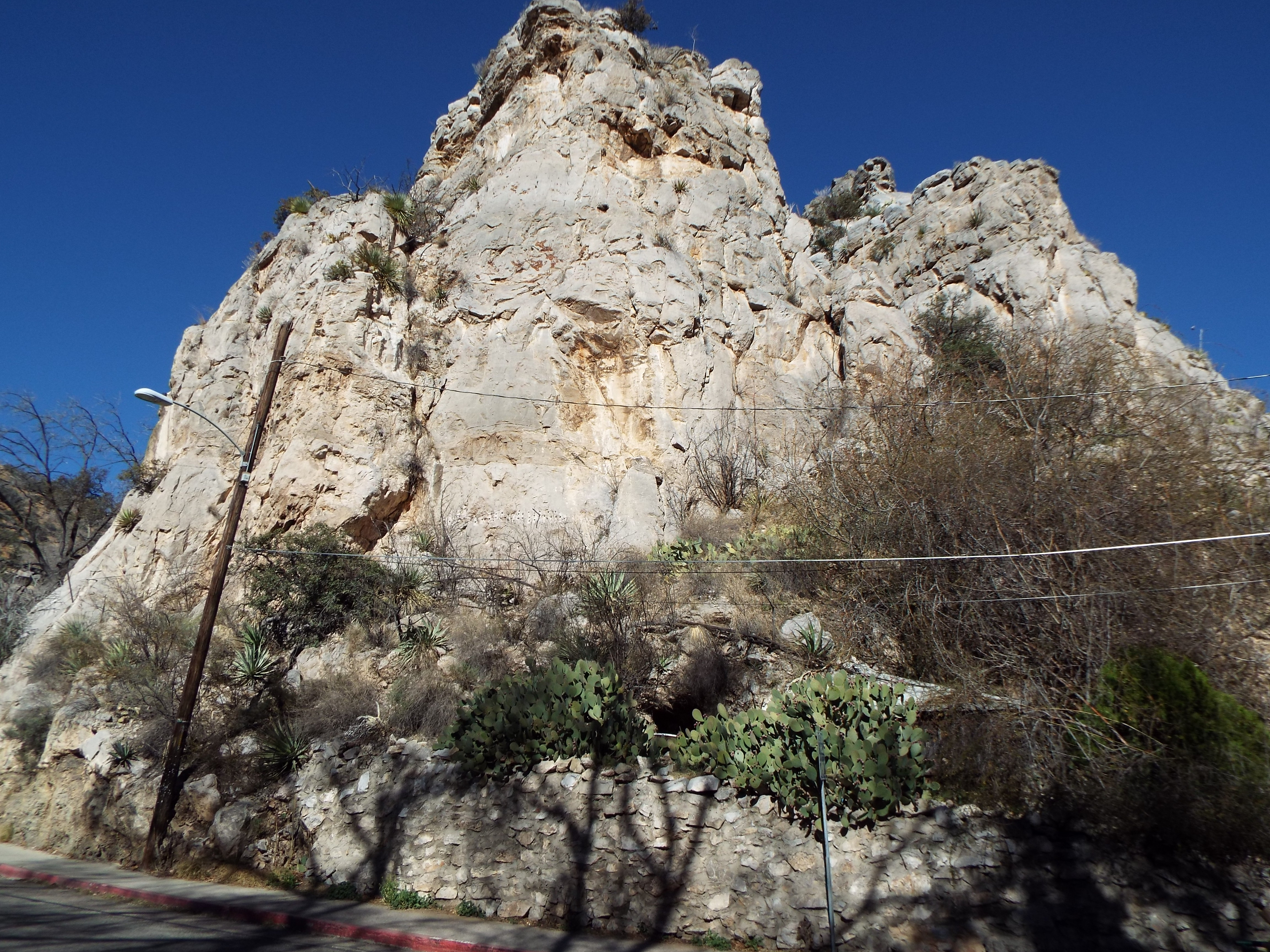
Castle Rock

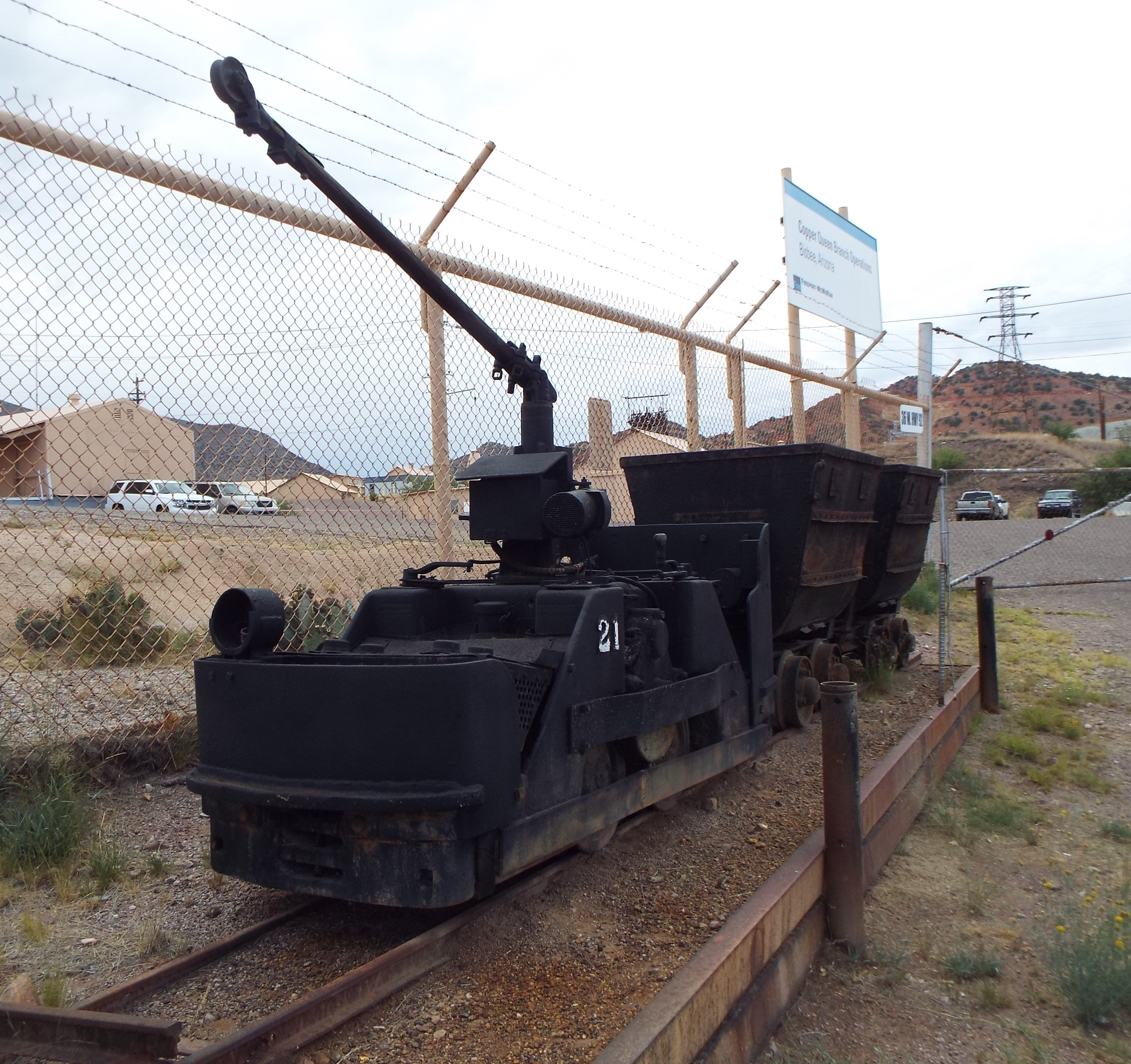
Copper Queen Mine equipment

The following is a brief description of some of the historic structures in Bisbee.

- The Copper Queen Hospital – built 1880 and located at 29 Howell Street.
- The Letson Loft Hotel (Letson Loft Block) – built in 1883 and located at 26 Main Street. This is where the Goldwater-Castaneda Mercantile Store was originally located. On December 8, 1883, Daniel "Big Dan" Dowd, Comer W. "Red" Sample, Daniel "York" Kelly, William "Billy" Delaney and James "Tex" Howard held up the Goldwater-Castaneda Store. A gunfight between the thieves and the citizens of Bisbee took place on Main Street in front of the store leaving four people dead in what is known as the infamous "Bisbee Massacre".
- The Tombstone Canyon Inn – built in 1890 and located at 102 Tombstone Canyon.
- The Inn at Castle Rock – built in 1895 and located at 105 Tombstone Canyon.
- The Phelps Dodge Headquarters Building – built in 1896 and located at 5 Copper Queen Plaza. The building was the headquarters of the Phelps Dodge Mining Co. from 1896 to 1961. It now houses the Bisbee Mining & Historical Museum. It was the first museum in the southwest to be distinguished as a Smithsonian Affiliate Museum. The building was listed in the National Register of Historic Places on June 3, 1971, reference #71000109.
- The Silver King Hotel – built in 1900 and located at 41-43 Howell Street.
- The Bisbee Improvement Company Building – built in 1900 and located at 100-180 Naco Road.
- The Copper Queen Library and Bisbee Post Office . The building which both the library and the post office share was the original location of a corner grocery. The post office was established in 1900 and the library in 1907. They are located at 4-6 Main Street. The library is also a part of the Cochise County Library District despite being city-funded.
- The Old City Hall (originally the Bisbee City Fire Hall) – built in 1902 and located at 110-112 Naco Road. The bell which was located in the tower warned of dangers from fires and cave-ins to Apache attacks.
- The Copper Queen Hotel – built in 1902 and located at 11 Howell Street. President Teddy Roosevelt and actor John Wayne had been guests in the hotel. It is the oldest continuously operating hotel in Arizona.
- The Phelps Dodge Clinic (now known as the Bisbee Review Building) – built in 1902 and located at 12 Main Street.
- The Bisbee Women's Club House – built in 1902 and located at 74 Quality Hill. The house was listed in the National Register of Historic Places on January 31, 1985, reference #850000145.
- The Bisbee Gym Building – built in 1903 and located at 39 Howell Street.
- The Pythian Castle – built in 1904 and located at 29 OK Street.
- The Stock Exchange Building – built in 1905 and located at 15 Brewery Ave.
- The Bisbee Grand Hotel – built in 1906 and located at 61 Main Street.
- The Old Jail – built in 1909 and located at 9 OK Street.
- The Old Bisbee High School – built in 1914 and located at 104 Clawson Ave.
- The Old Bisbee High School Gym – built in 1914 and located at 104 Clawson Ave.
- The School House now the School House Inn – built in 1918 and located at 818 Tombstone Canyon.
- The Sheriff's Office and Justice Court Building – built in 1918 and located at 116 Naco Road.
- The Shattuck-Schmid Building – built in 1904 and located at 20 Brewery Avenue.
- The San Ramon Hotel – built in 1902 and located at 5 Howell Ave.
- St. Elmo Bar – built in 1902 and located at 36 Brewery Ave.
- St. Patrick's Roman Catholic Church – built in 1917 and located at 100 Quality Hill. The church was listed in the National Register of Historic Places on September 7, 1995, reference #950001080.
- The Presbyterian Church – built in 1902 and located at 19 Howell Street.
- The Walter Douglas House – built in 1908 and located at 201 Cole Ave. The house was listed in the National Register of Historic Places on September 22, 2000, reference #00001125.
- The Muheim House – built in 1900 and located at 207 Youngblood Hill. The house was built for Joseph and Carmelita Muheim. It is now referred to as Muheim Heritage House Museum. The house was listed in the National Register of Historic Places on January 23, 1979, reference #79000746.
- The Mule Pass Tunnel – built in 1958 and located on SR 80 in Cochise County and at the northern entrance to the town of Bisbee. The tunnel is 1,400 ft. long. It was the longest tunnel in Arizona until construction of the tunnel in Phoenix on Interstate 10.
- The San Pedro Valley Railroad Overpass – built in 1888 in Bisbee

== Historic structures pictured ==
The following are the images of the historic structures in Bisbee and its surrounding areas.

Historic Bisbee, Arizona
(National Register of Historic Places)
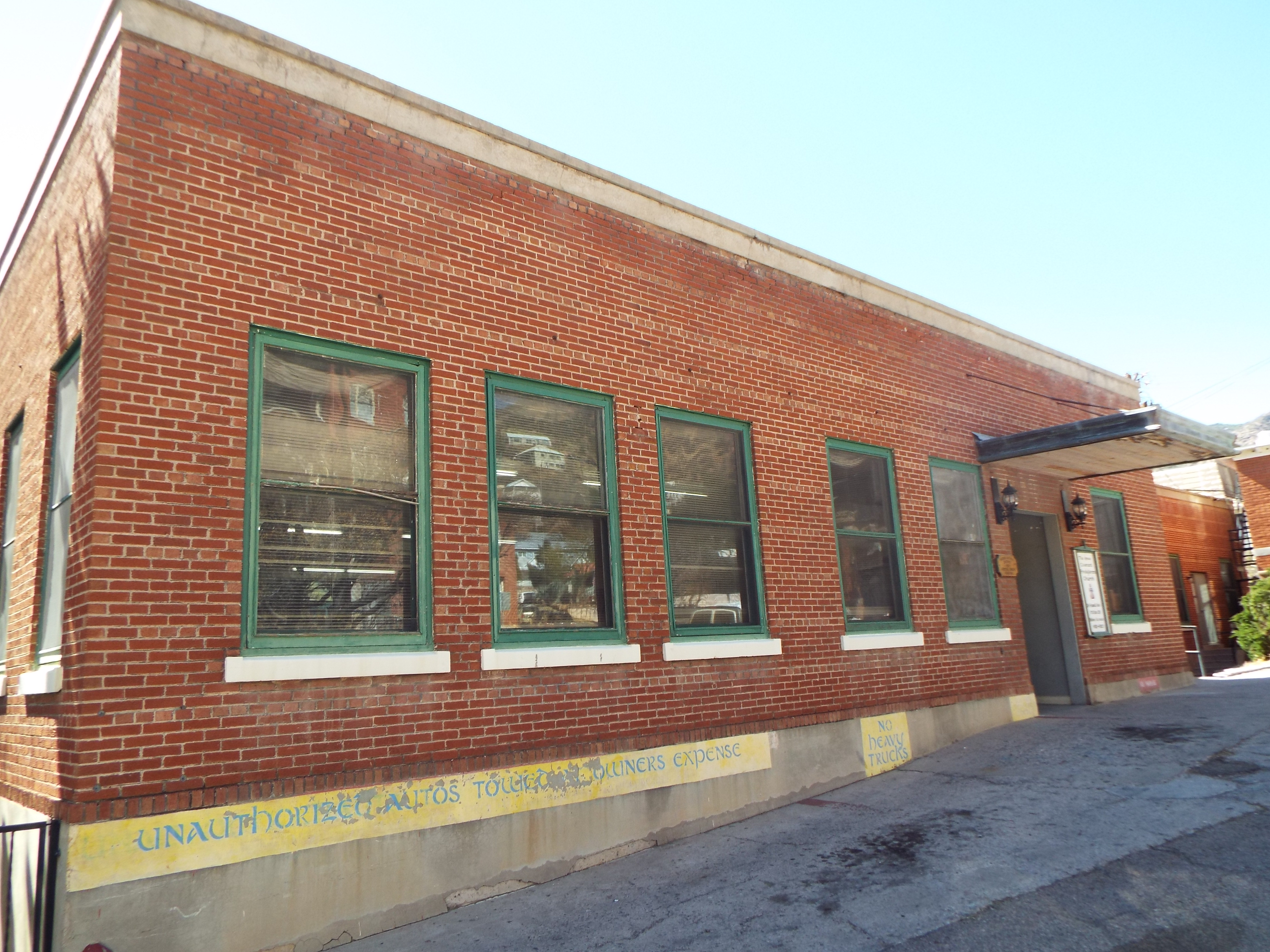
The Copper Queen Hospital .

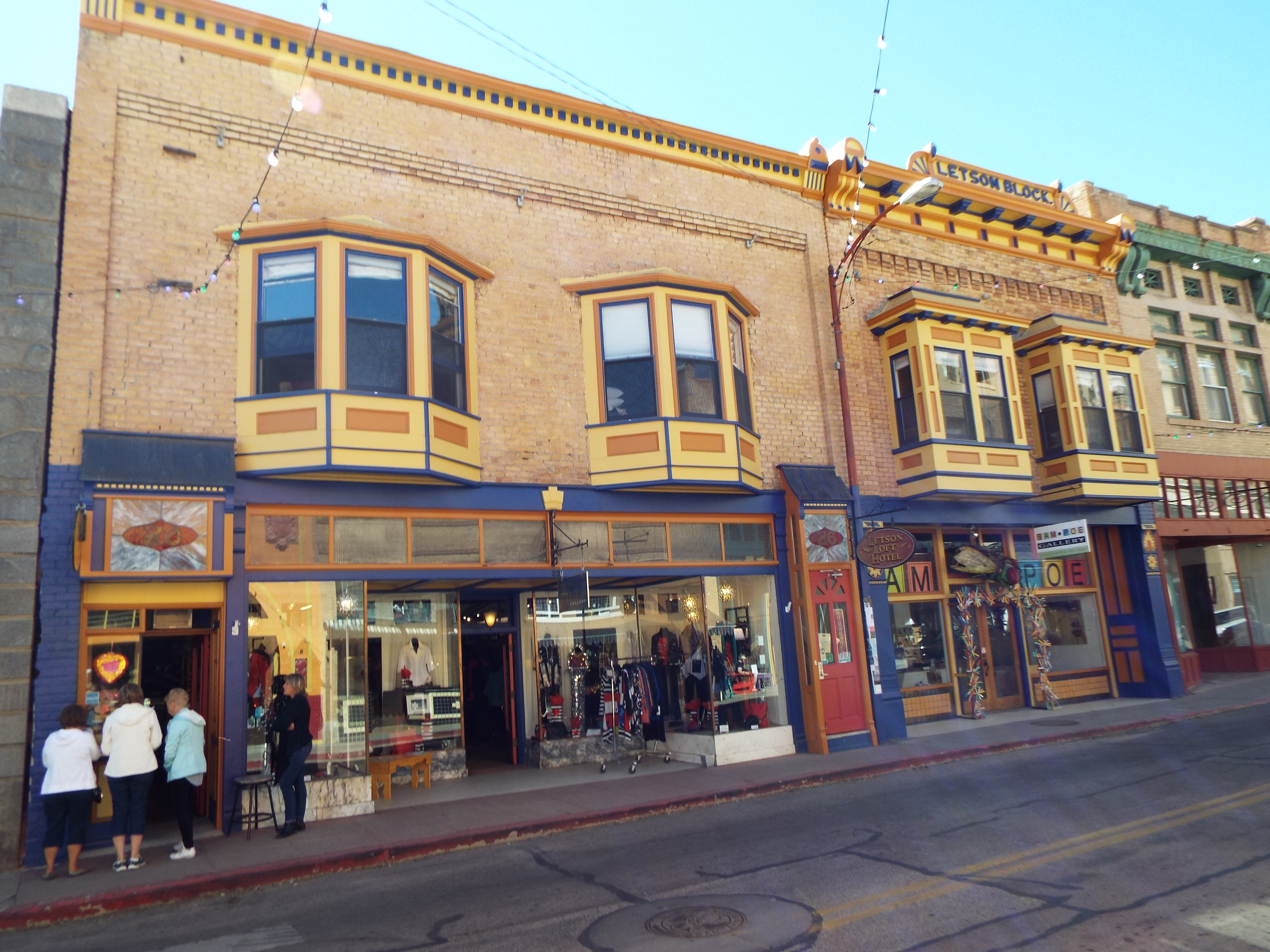
The Letson Loft Hotel (Letson Loft Block).

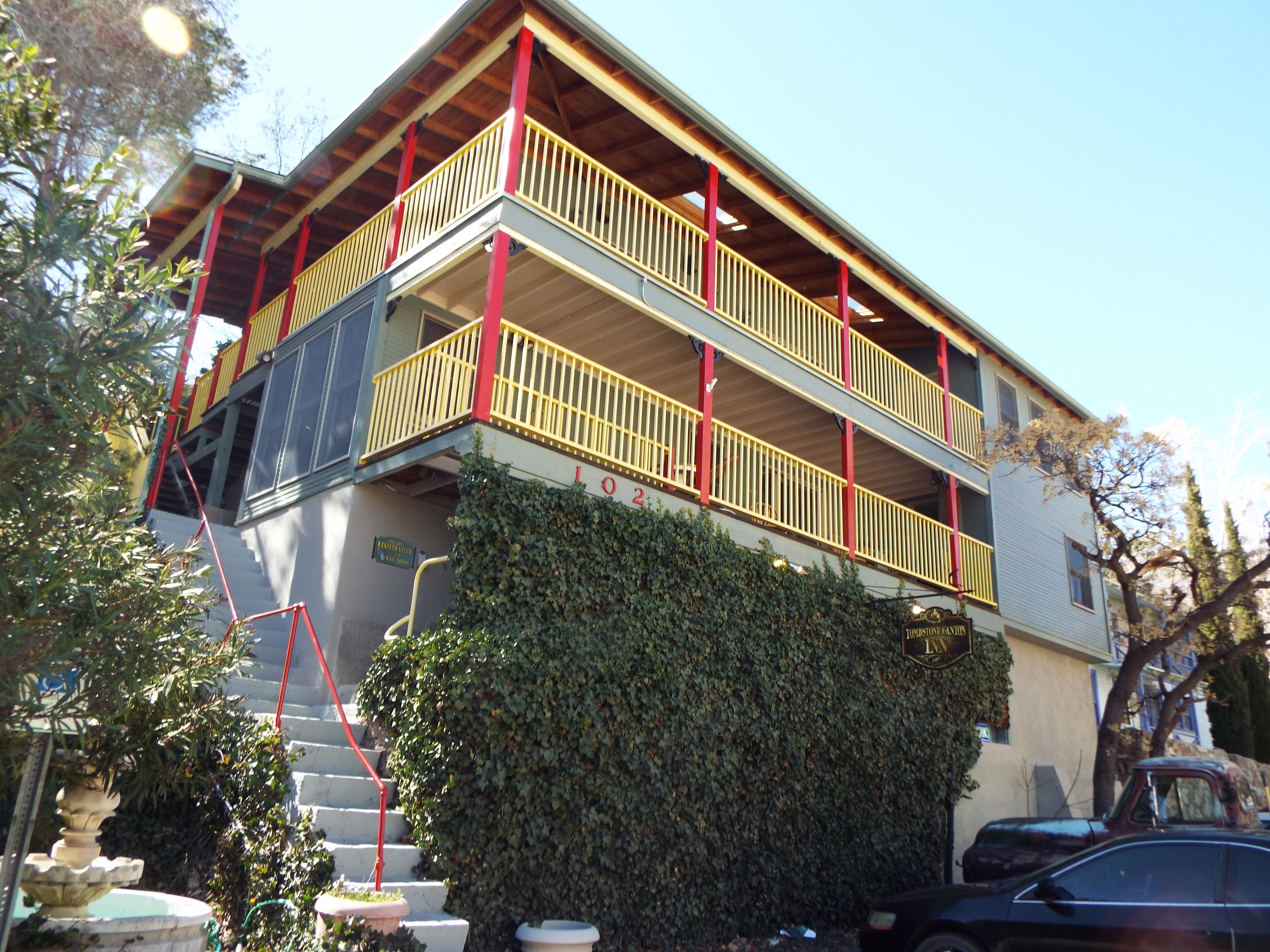
The Tombstone Canyon Inn.

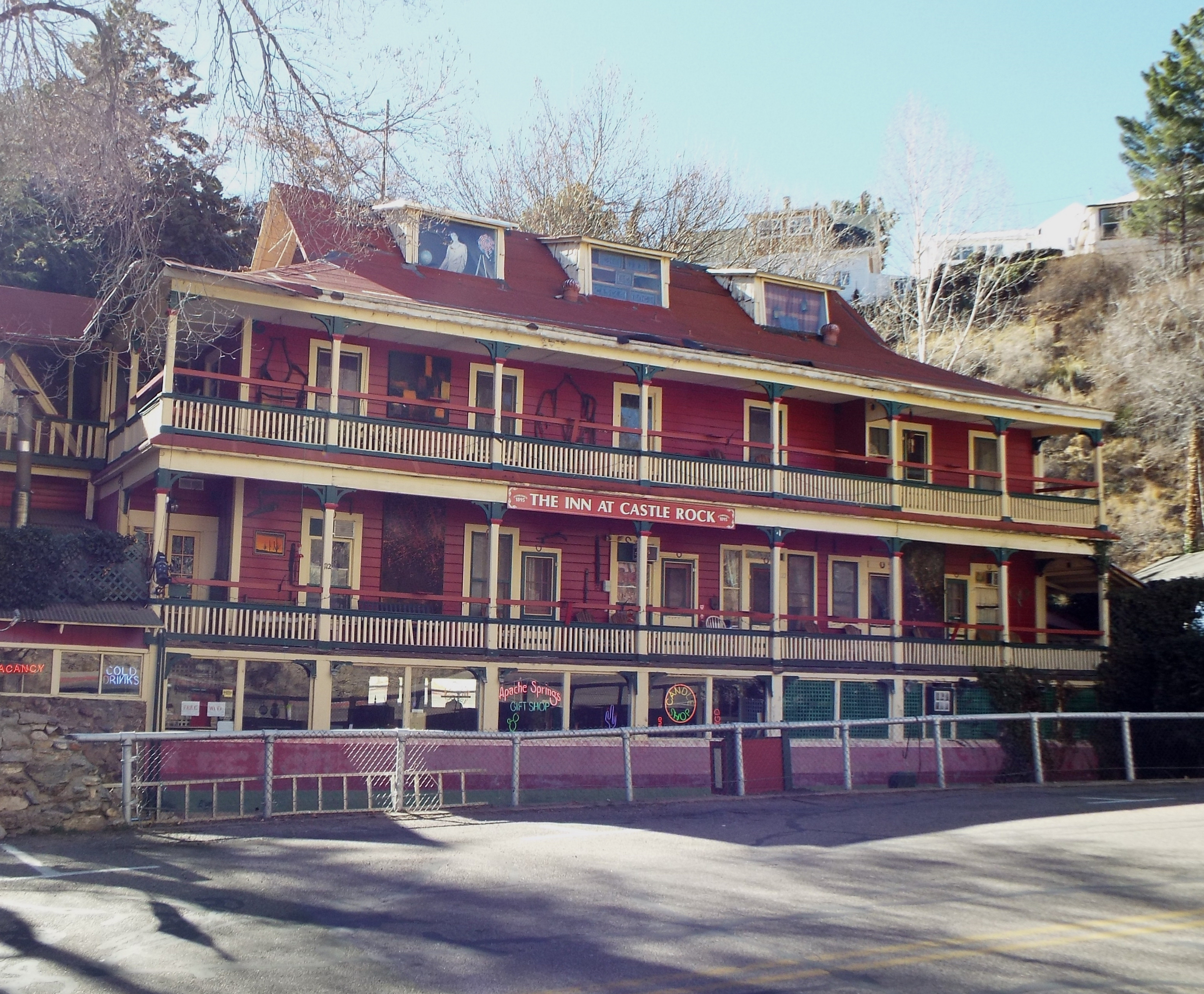
The Inn at Castle Rock.

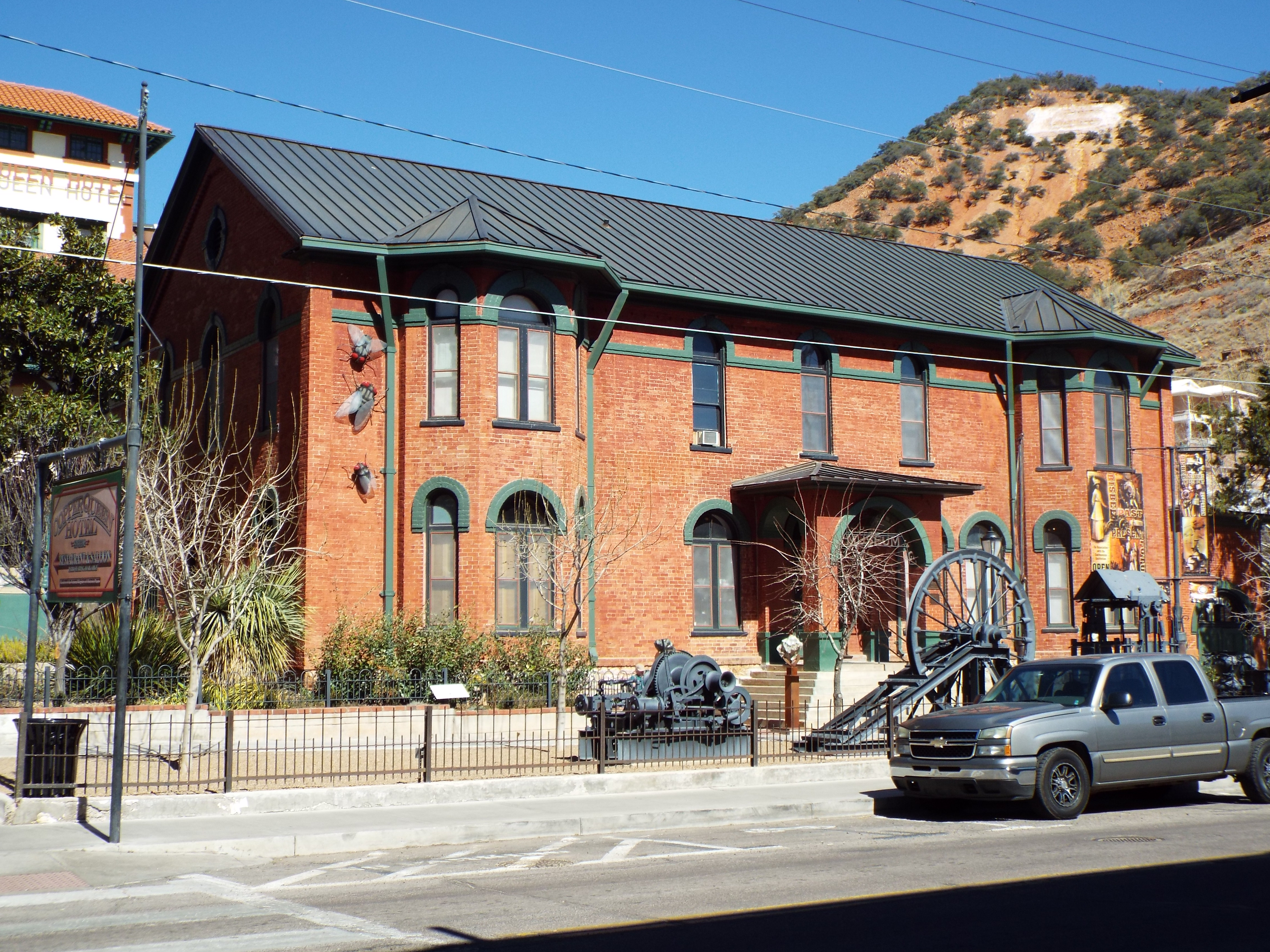
The Phelps Dodge Headquarters Building.

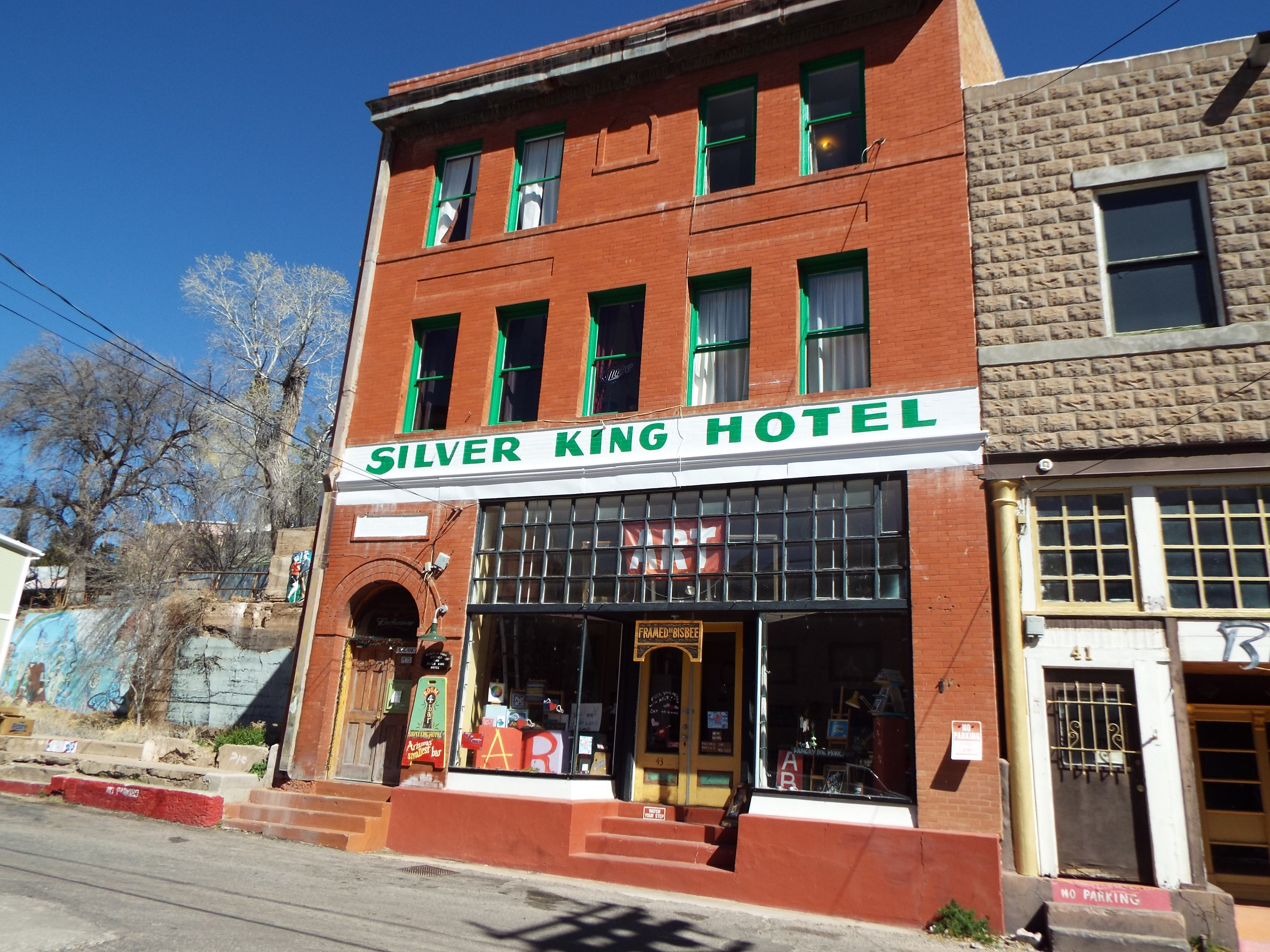
The Silver King Hotel.

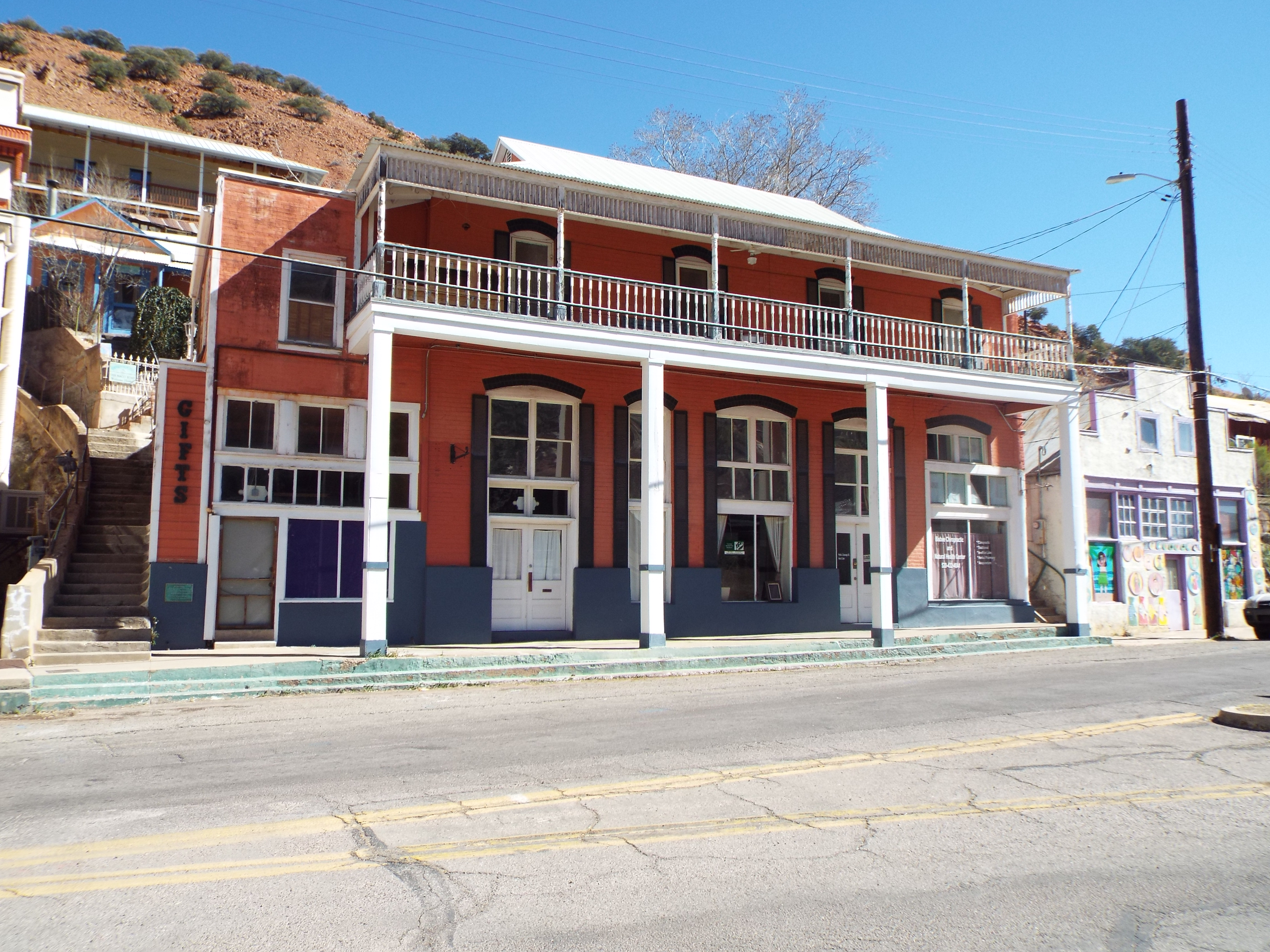
The Bisbee Improvement Company Building.

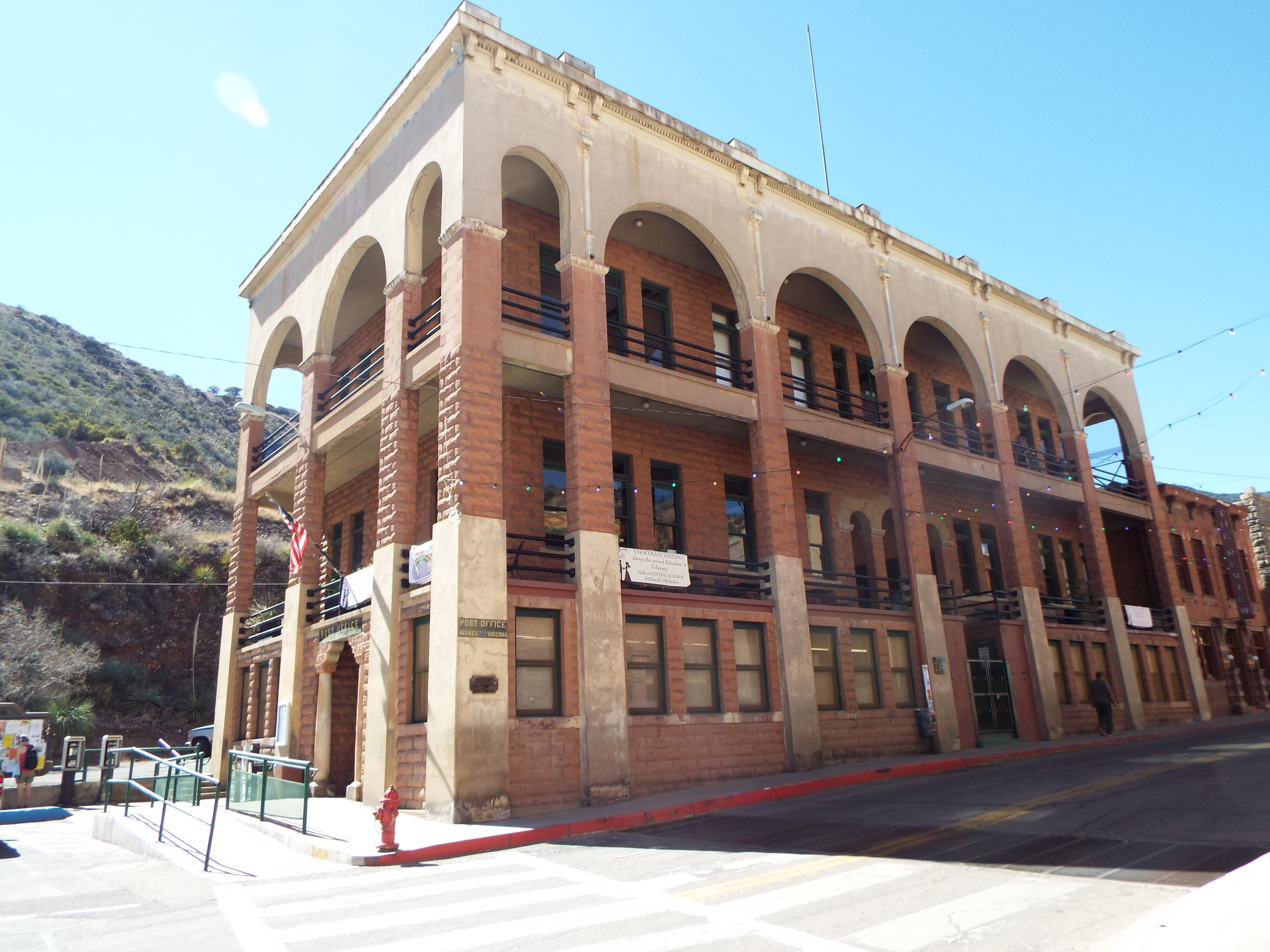
The Copper Queen Library and Bisbee Post Office .

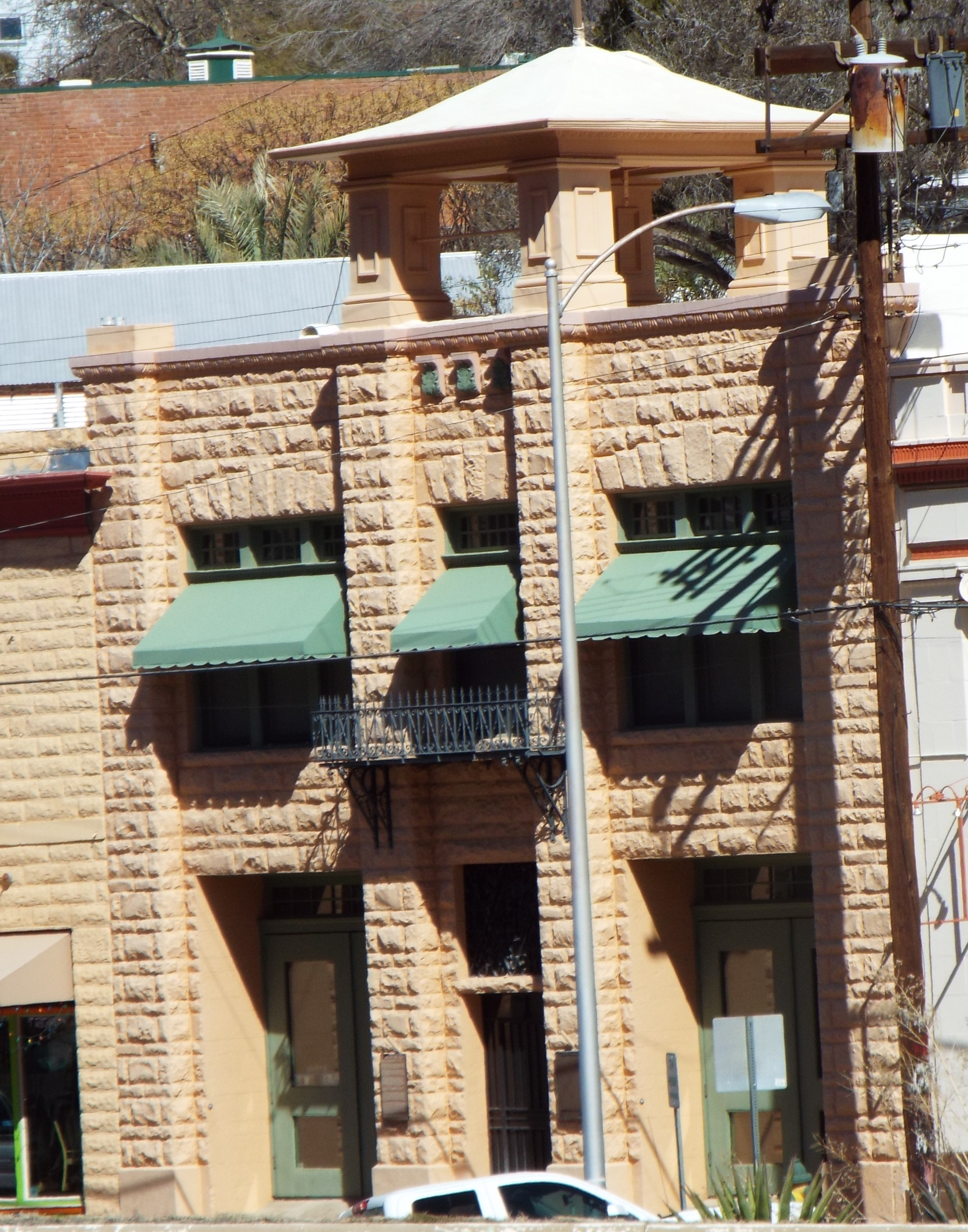
The Old City Hall (originally the Bisbee City Fire Hall).

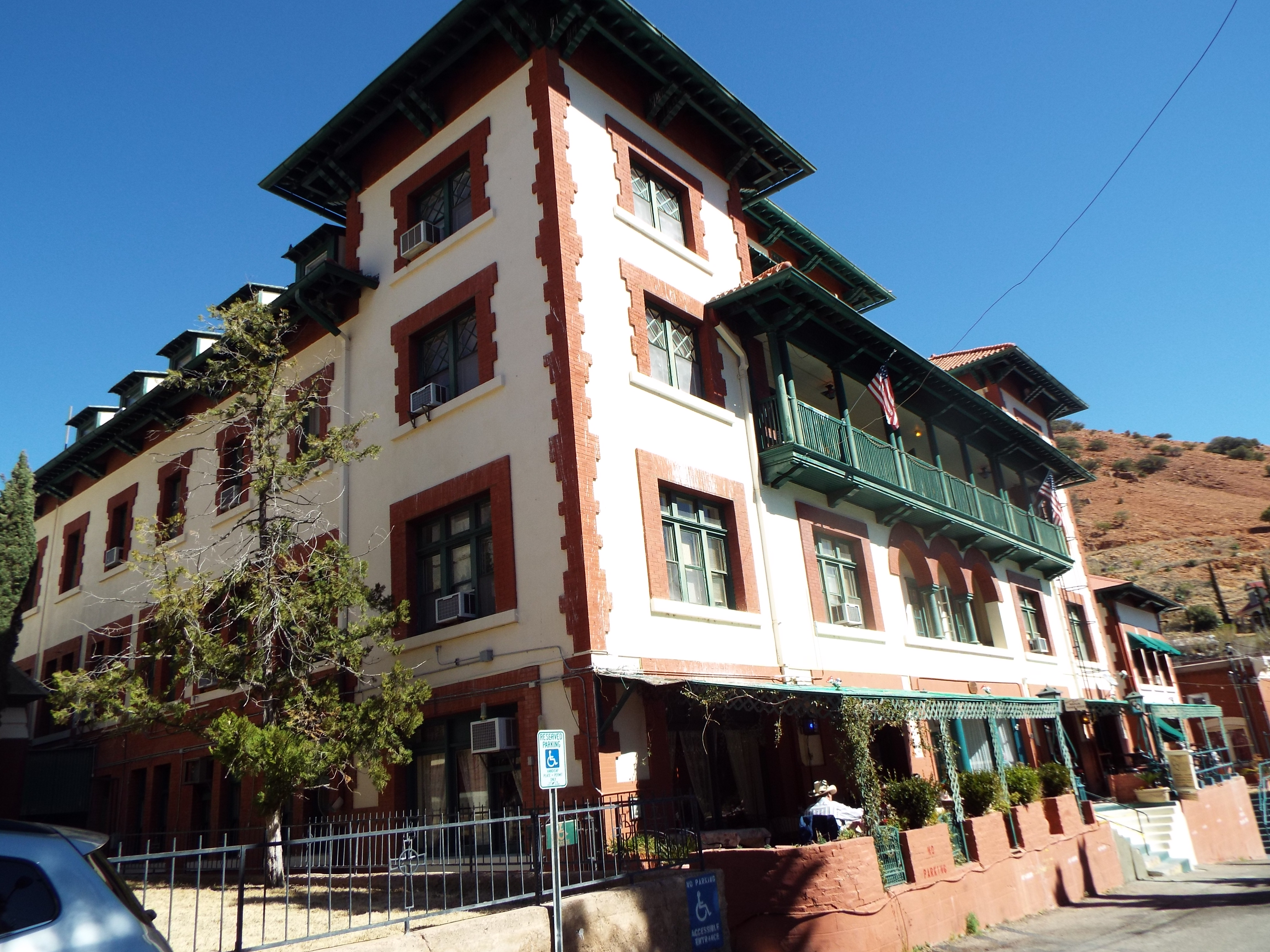
The Copper Queen Hotel.

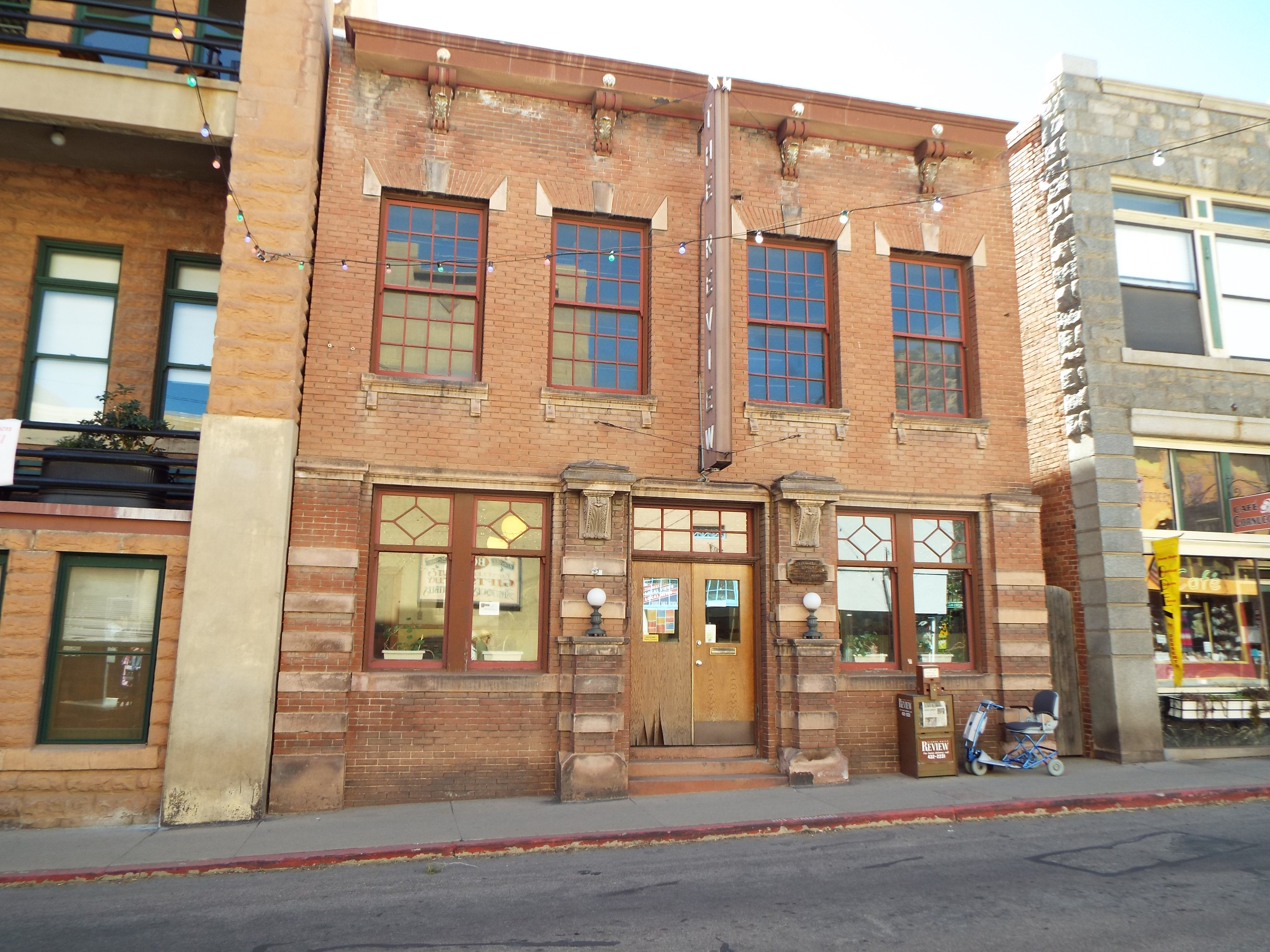
The Phelps Dodge Clinic (now known as the Bisbee Review Building).

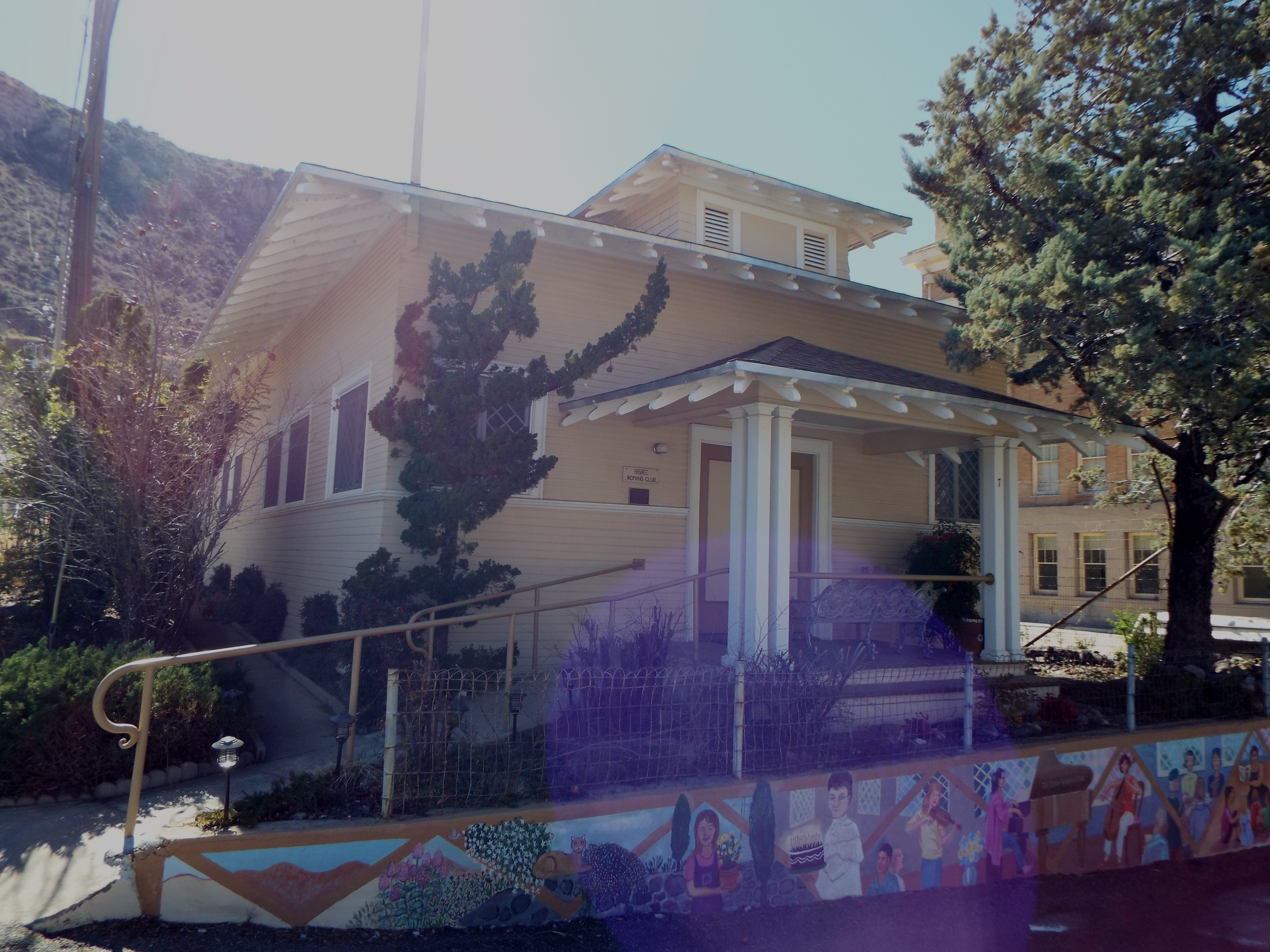
The Bisbee Women’s Club House.

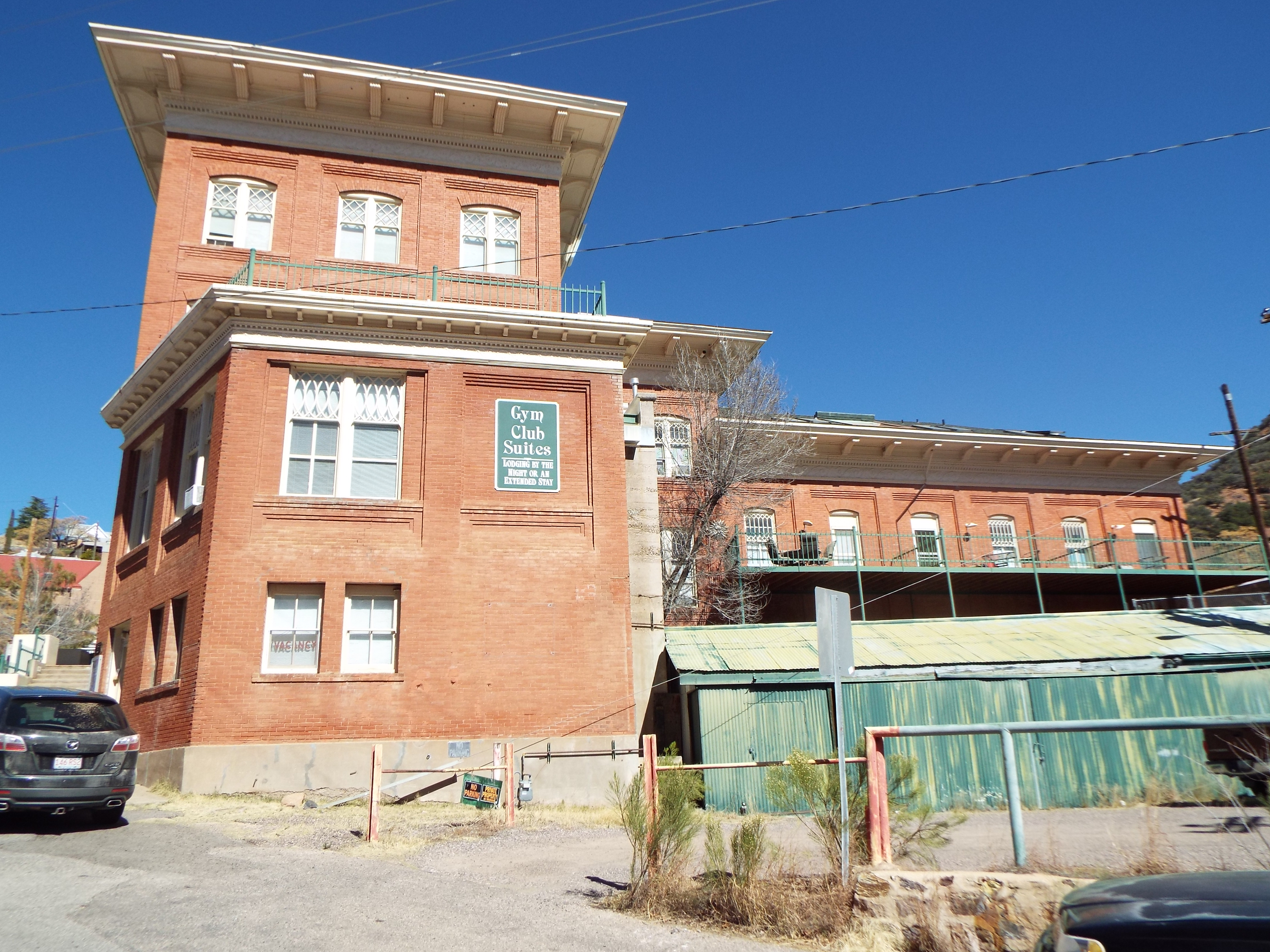
The Bisbee Gym Building.

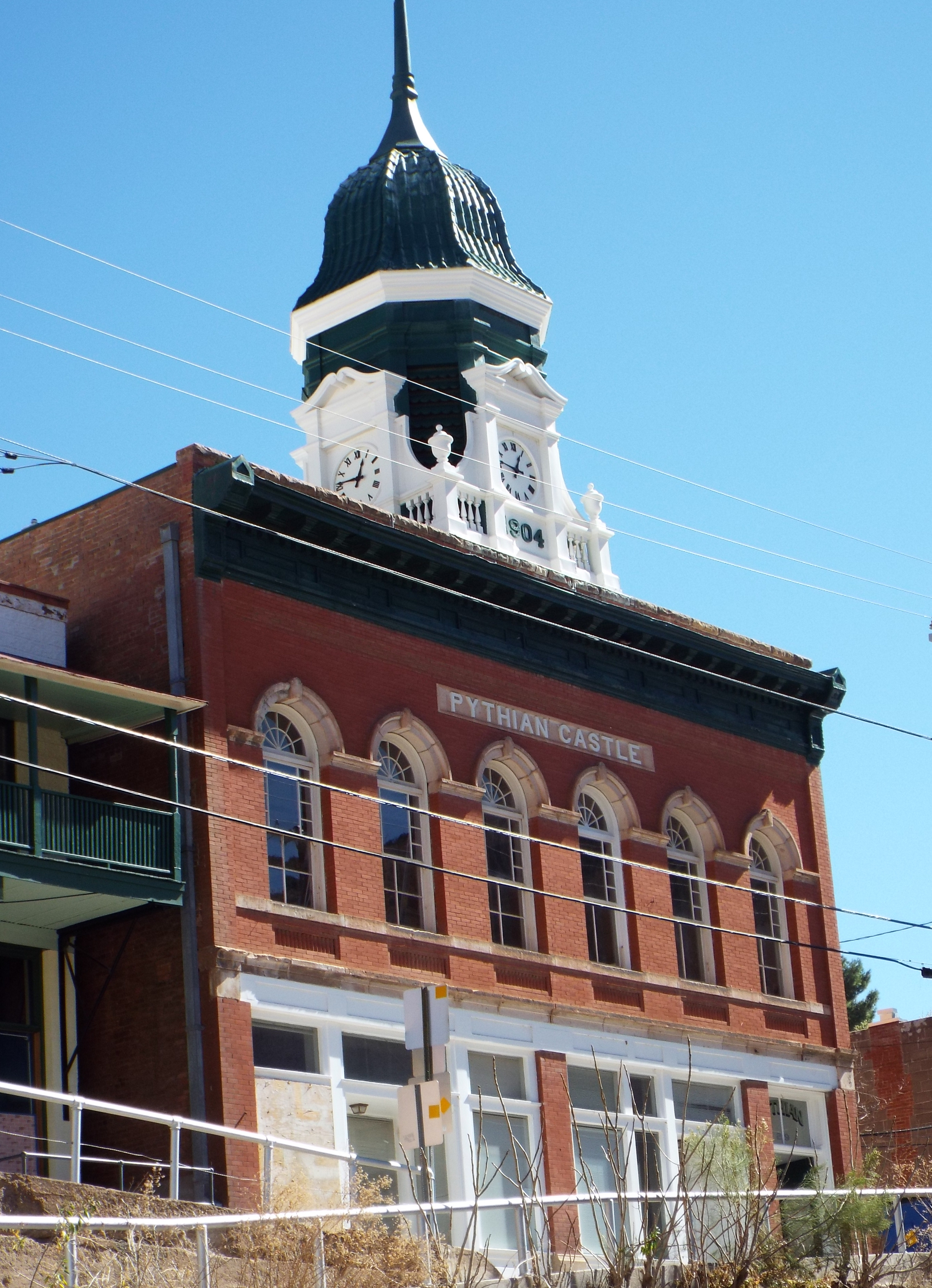
The Pythian Castle.

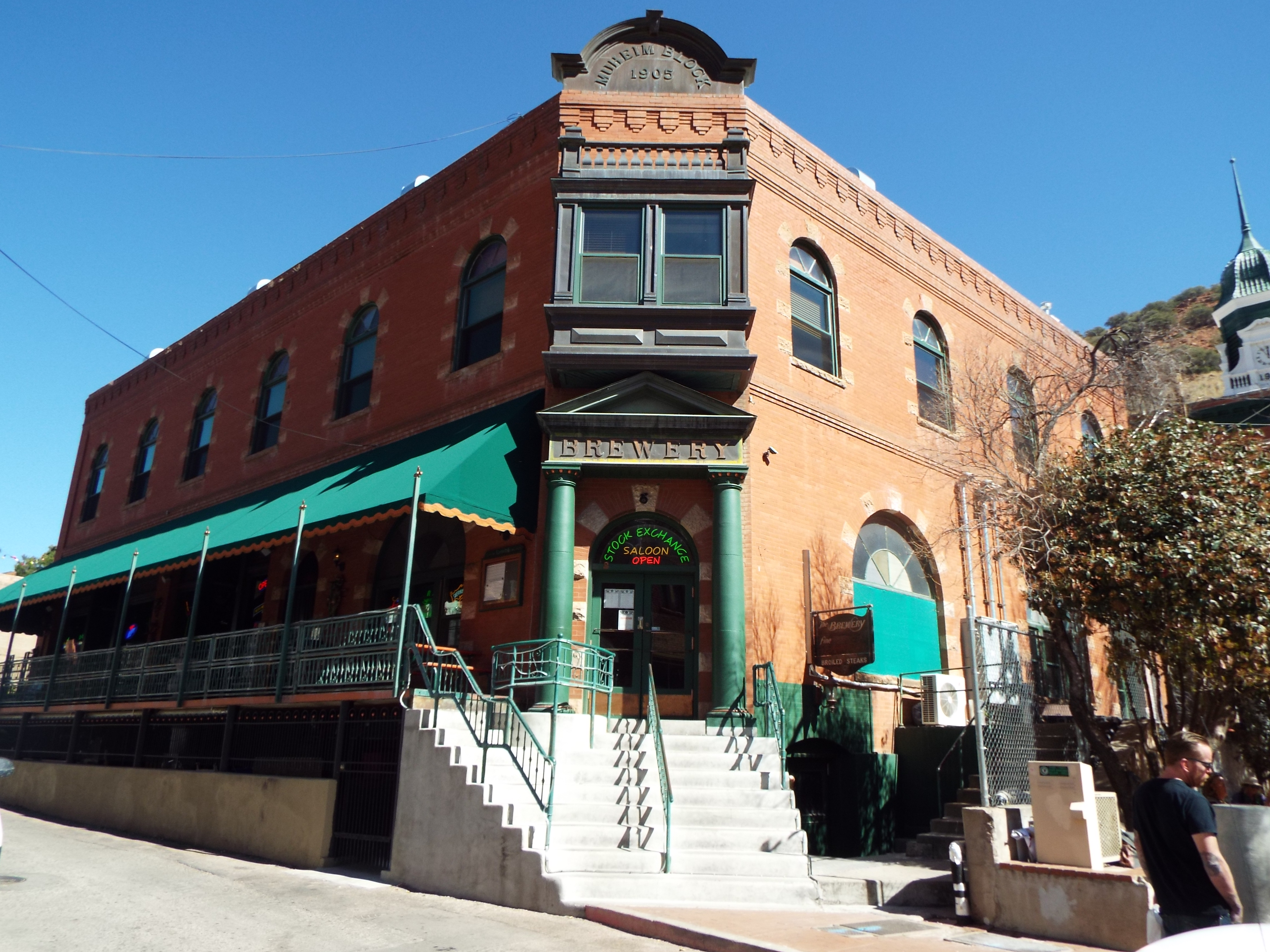
The Stock Exchange Building.

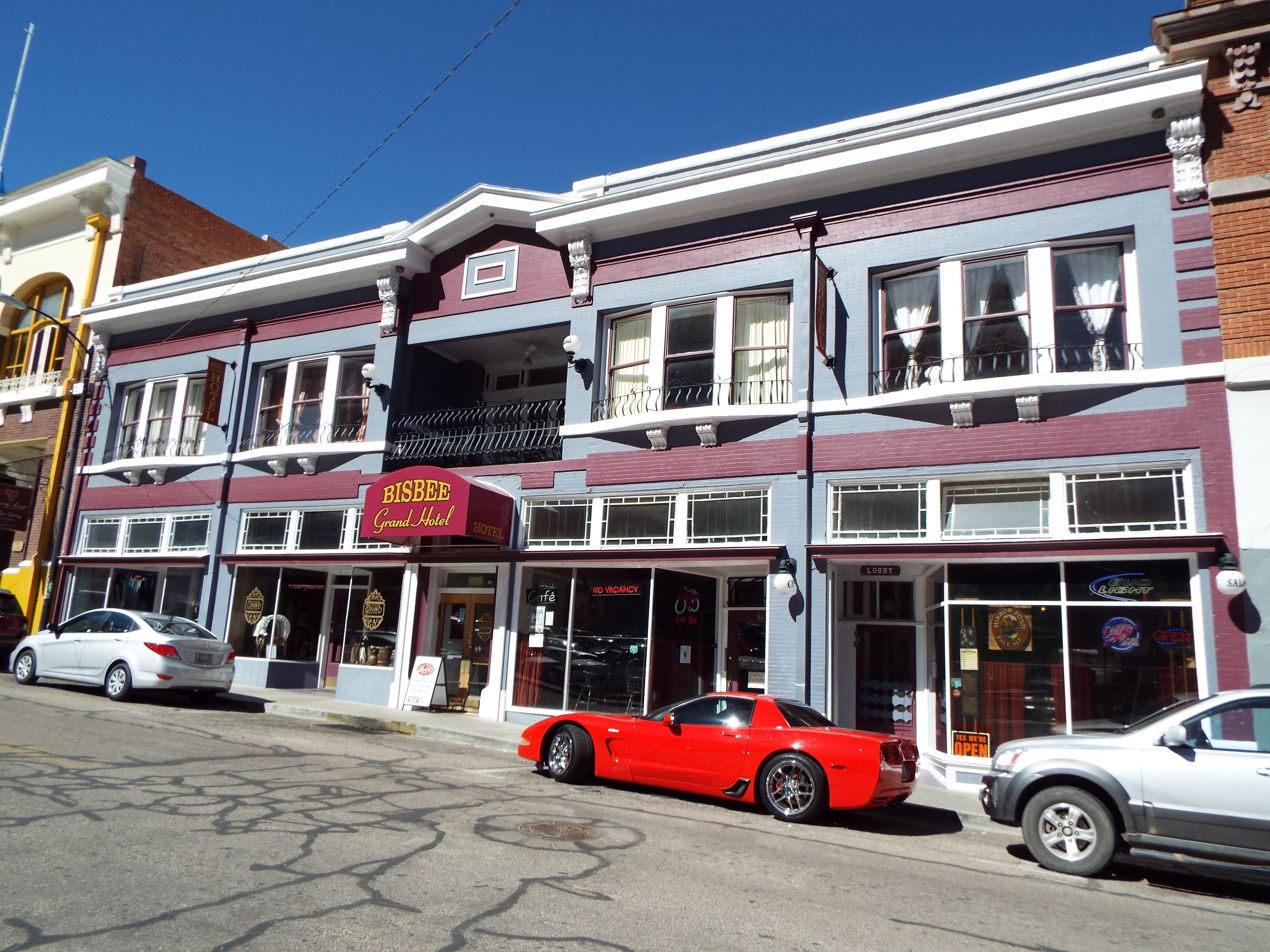
The Bisbee Grand Hotel.

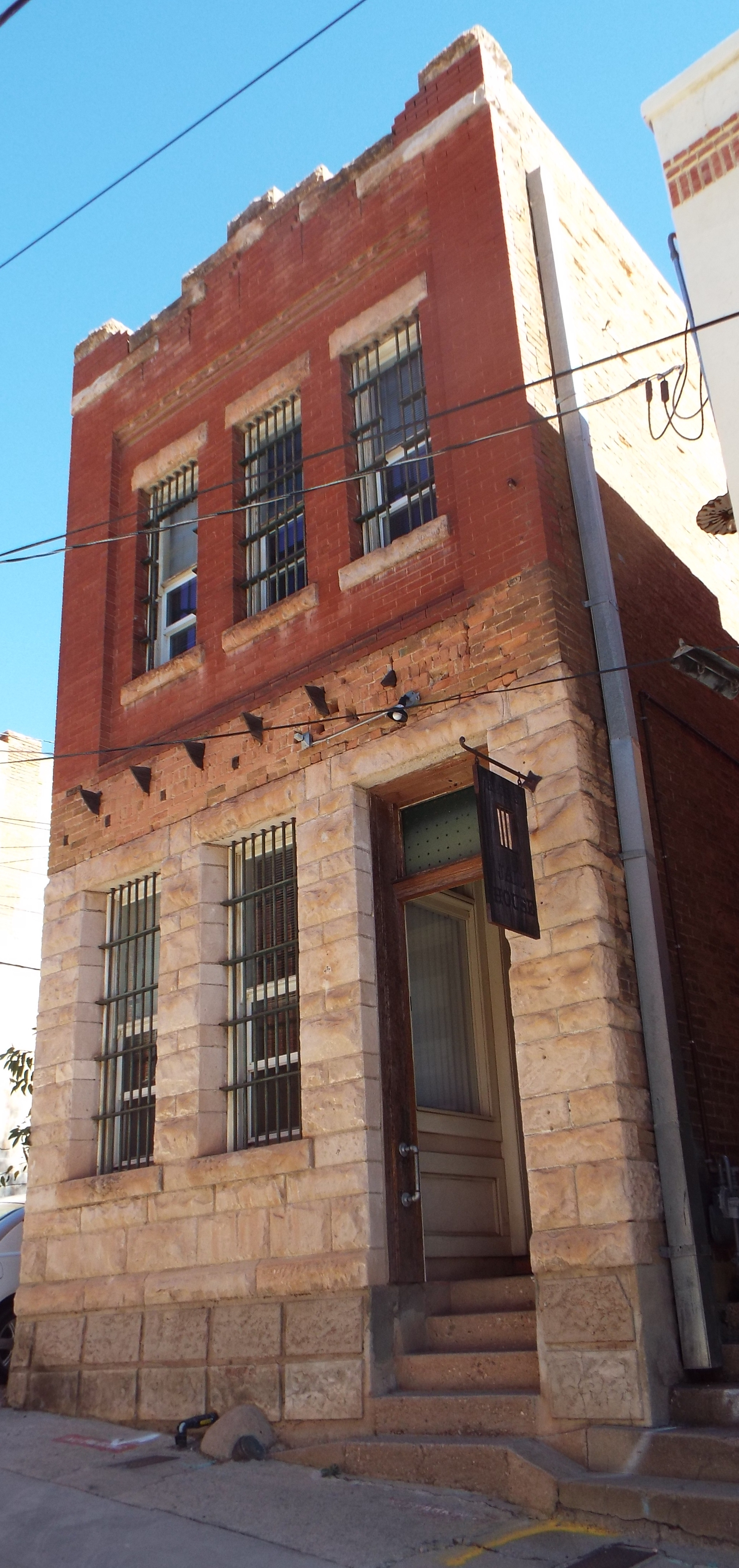
The Old Jail.

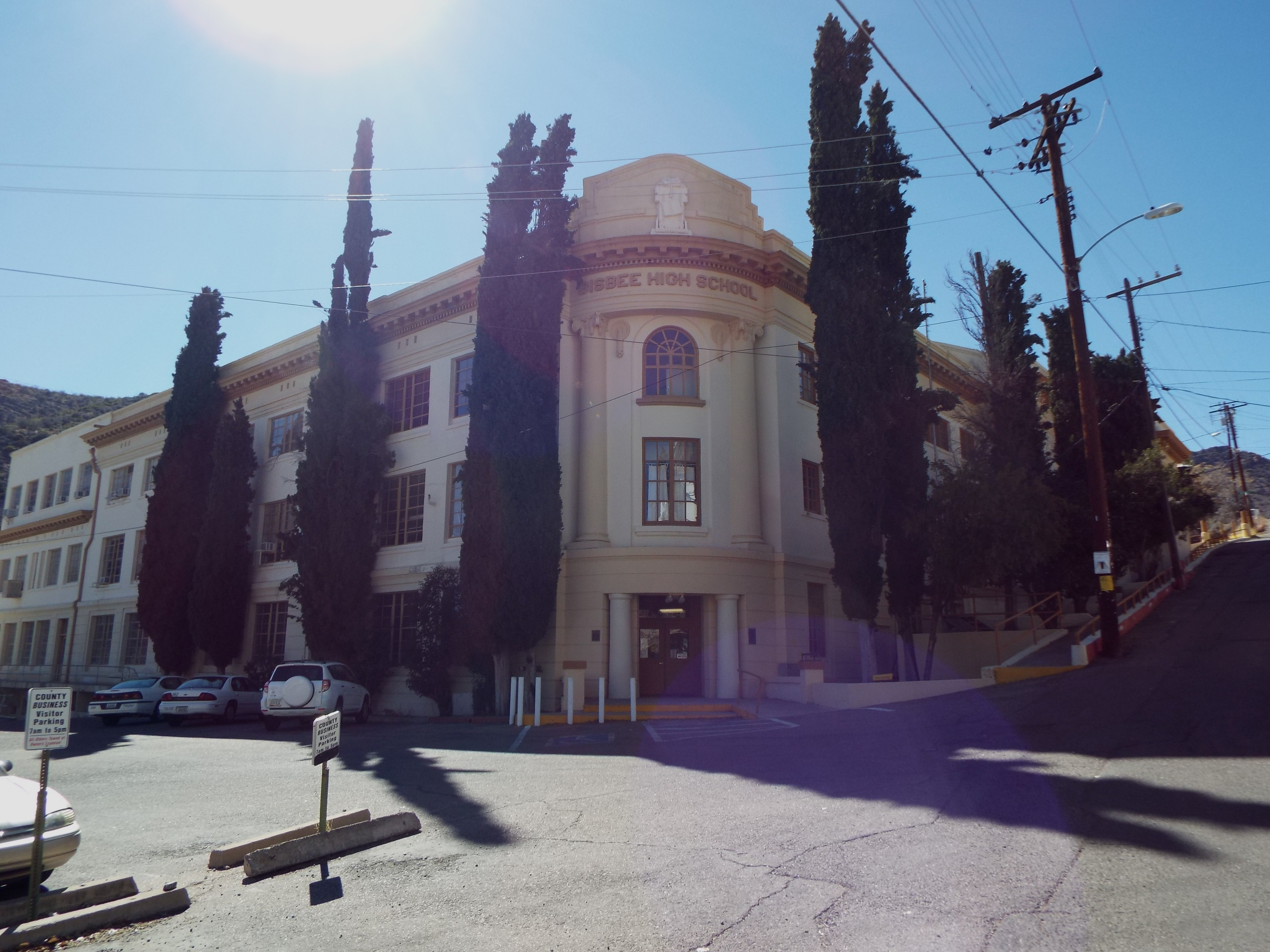
The Old Bisbee High School.

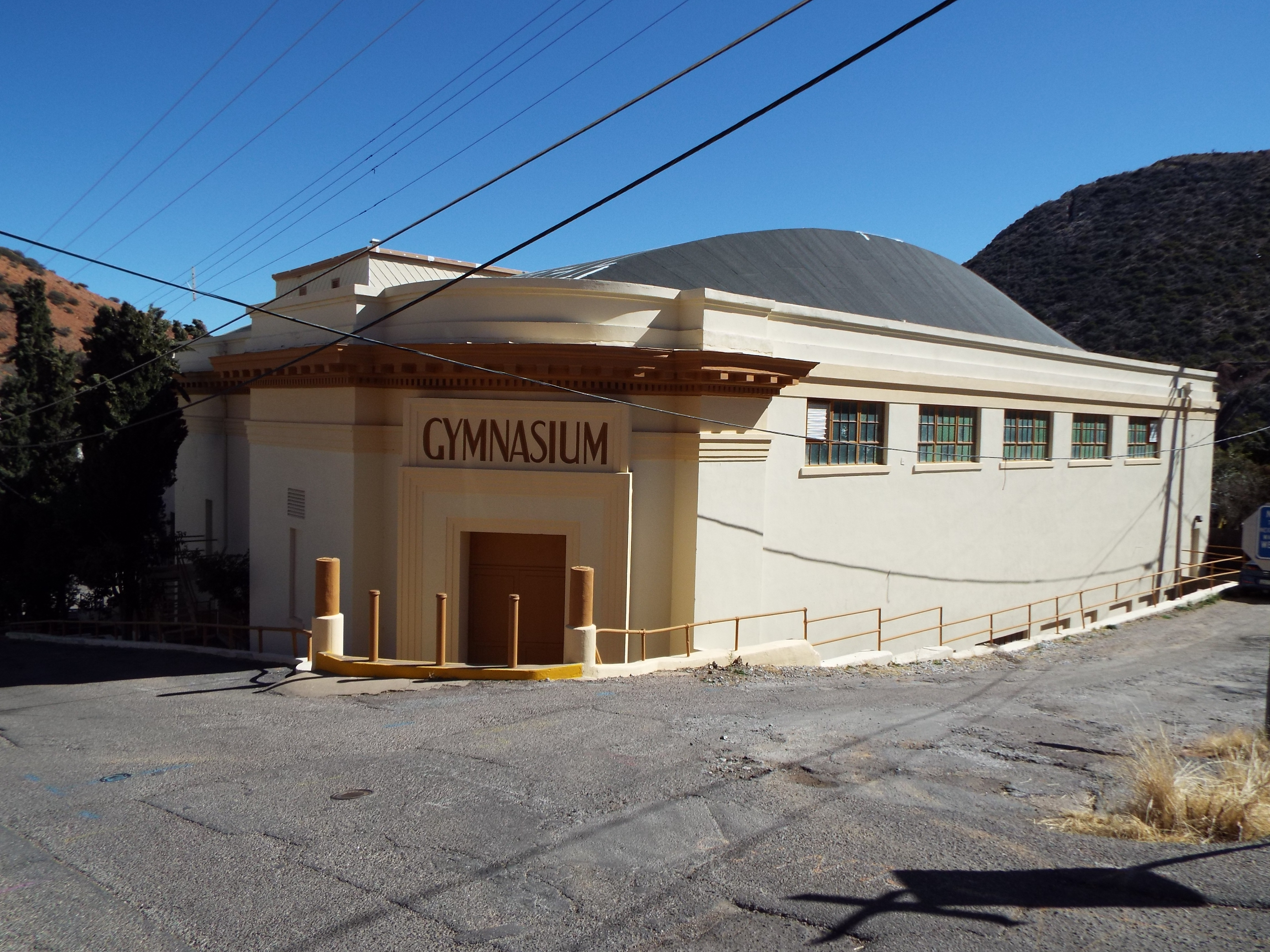
The Old Bisbee High School Gym.

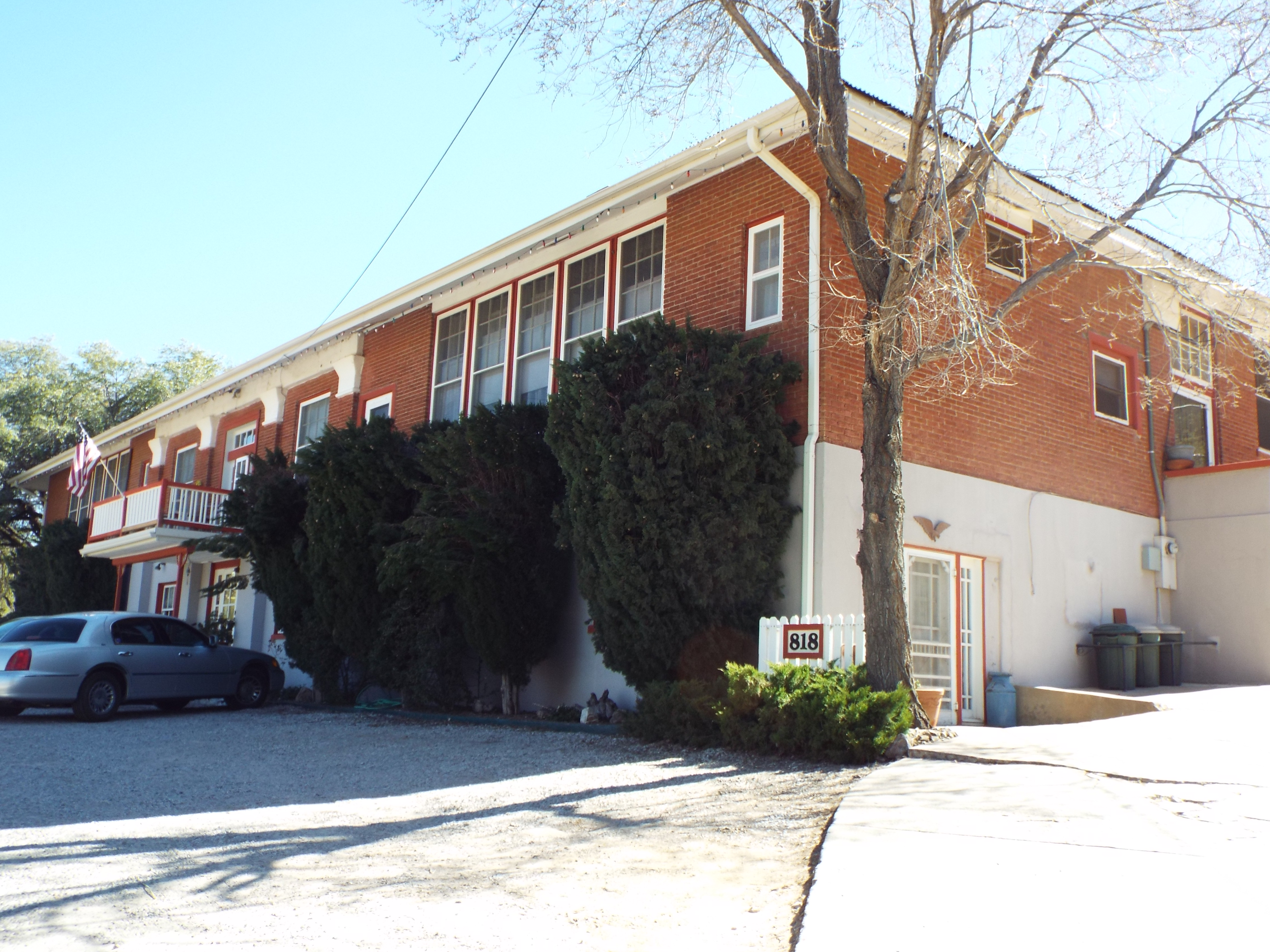
The School House now the School House Inn.

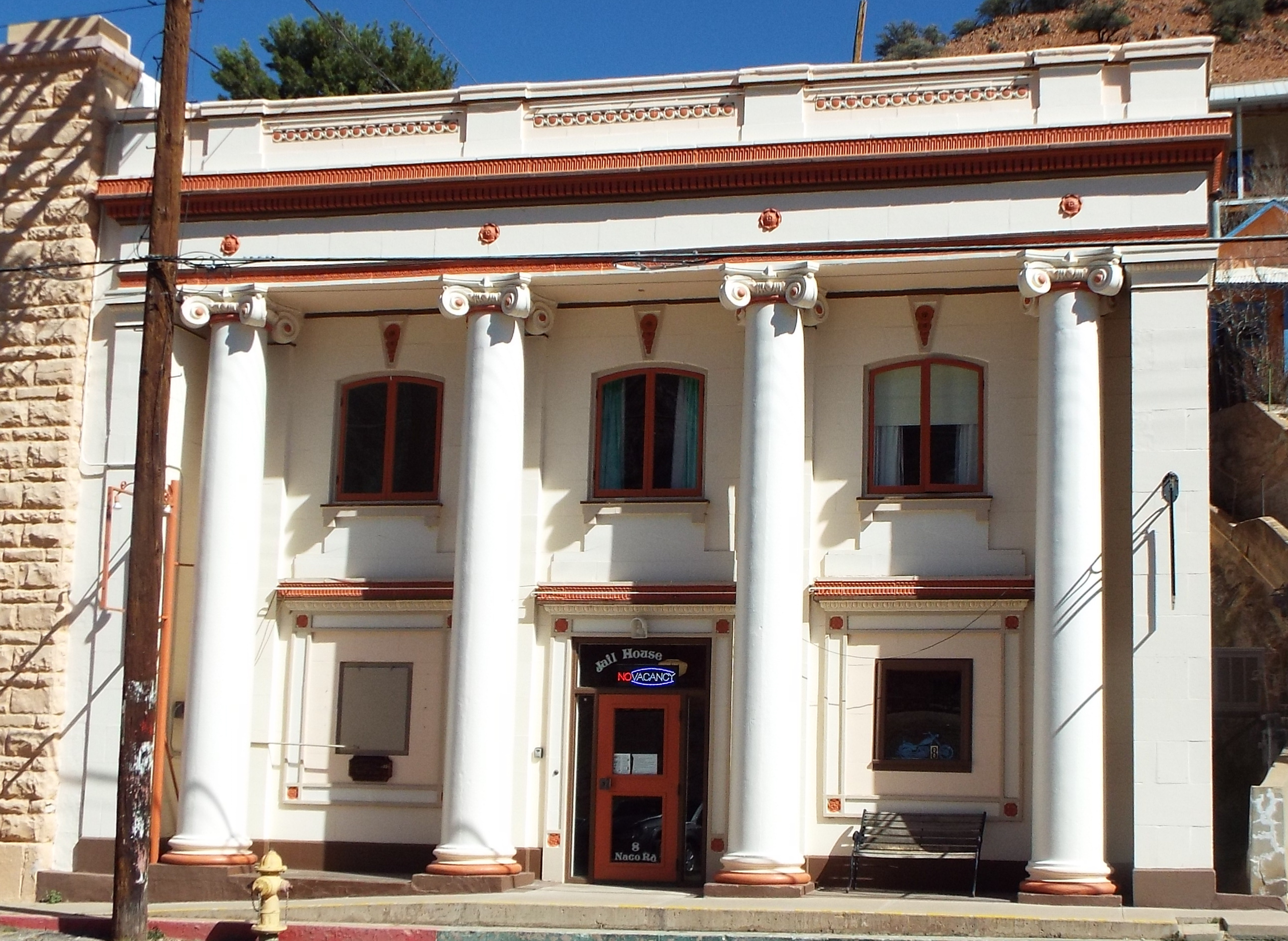
The Sheriff's Office and Justice Court Building.

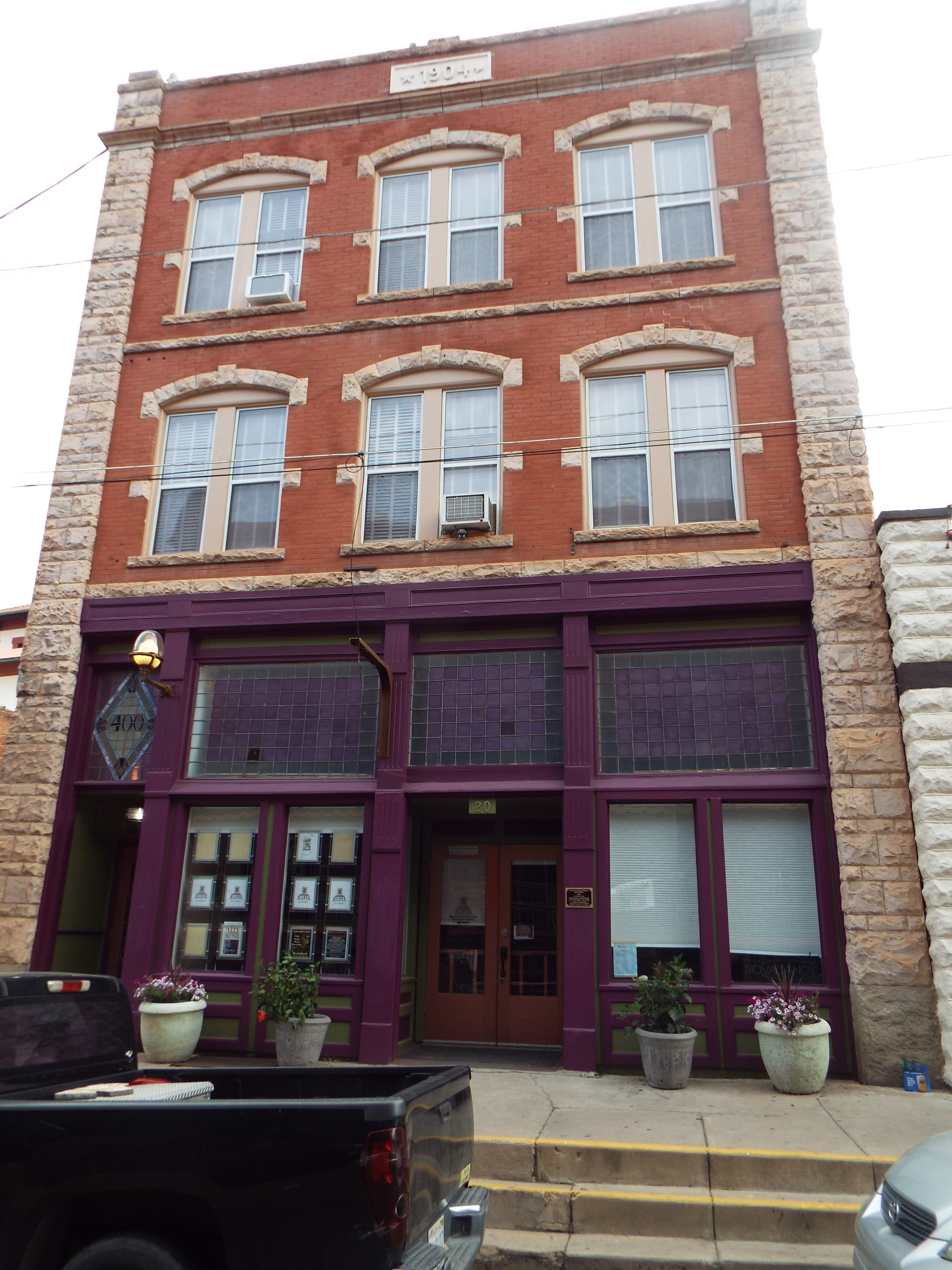
The Shattuck-Schmid Building

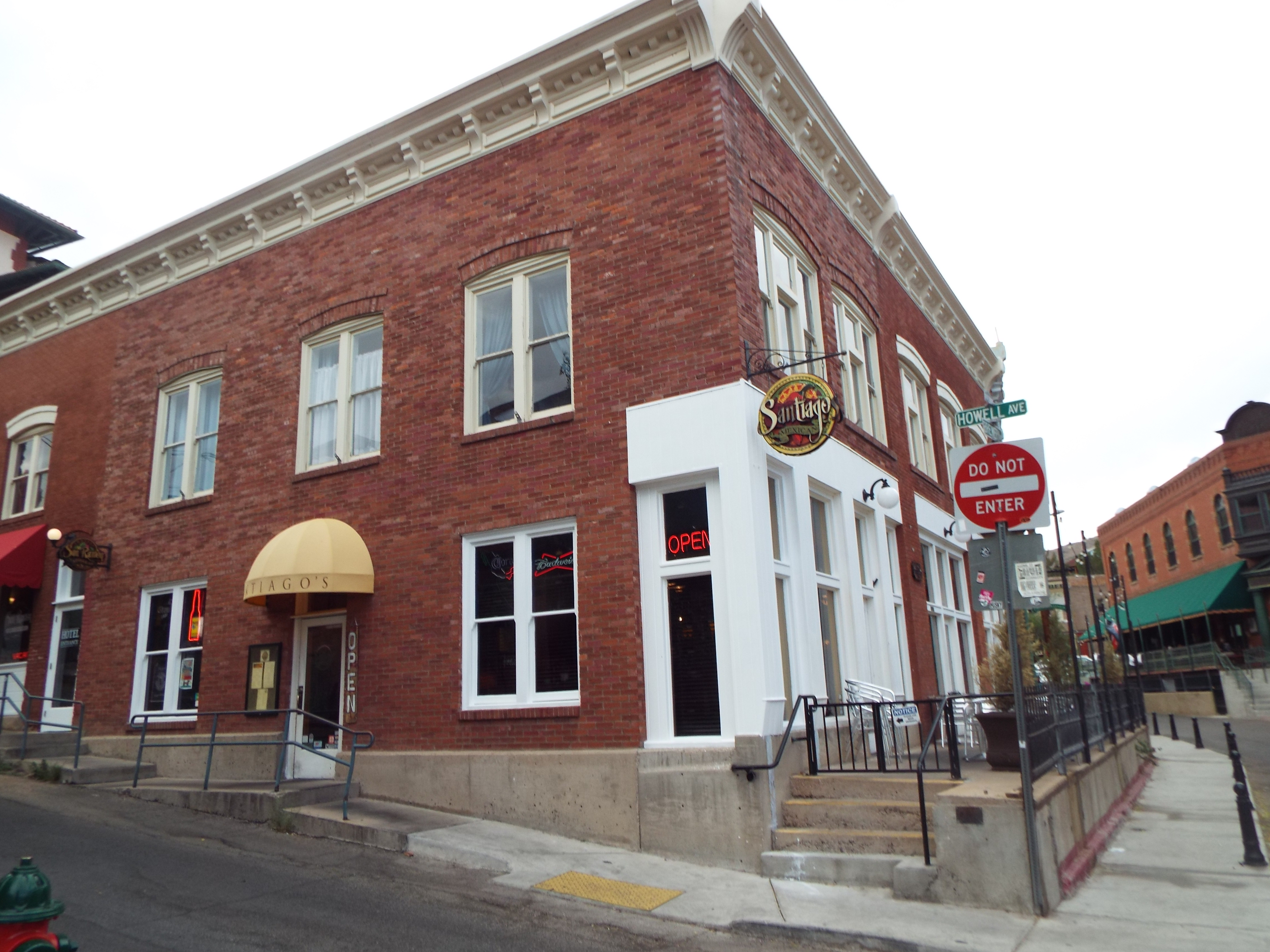
The San Ramon Hotel

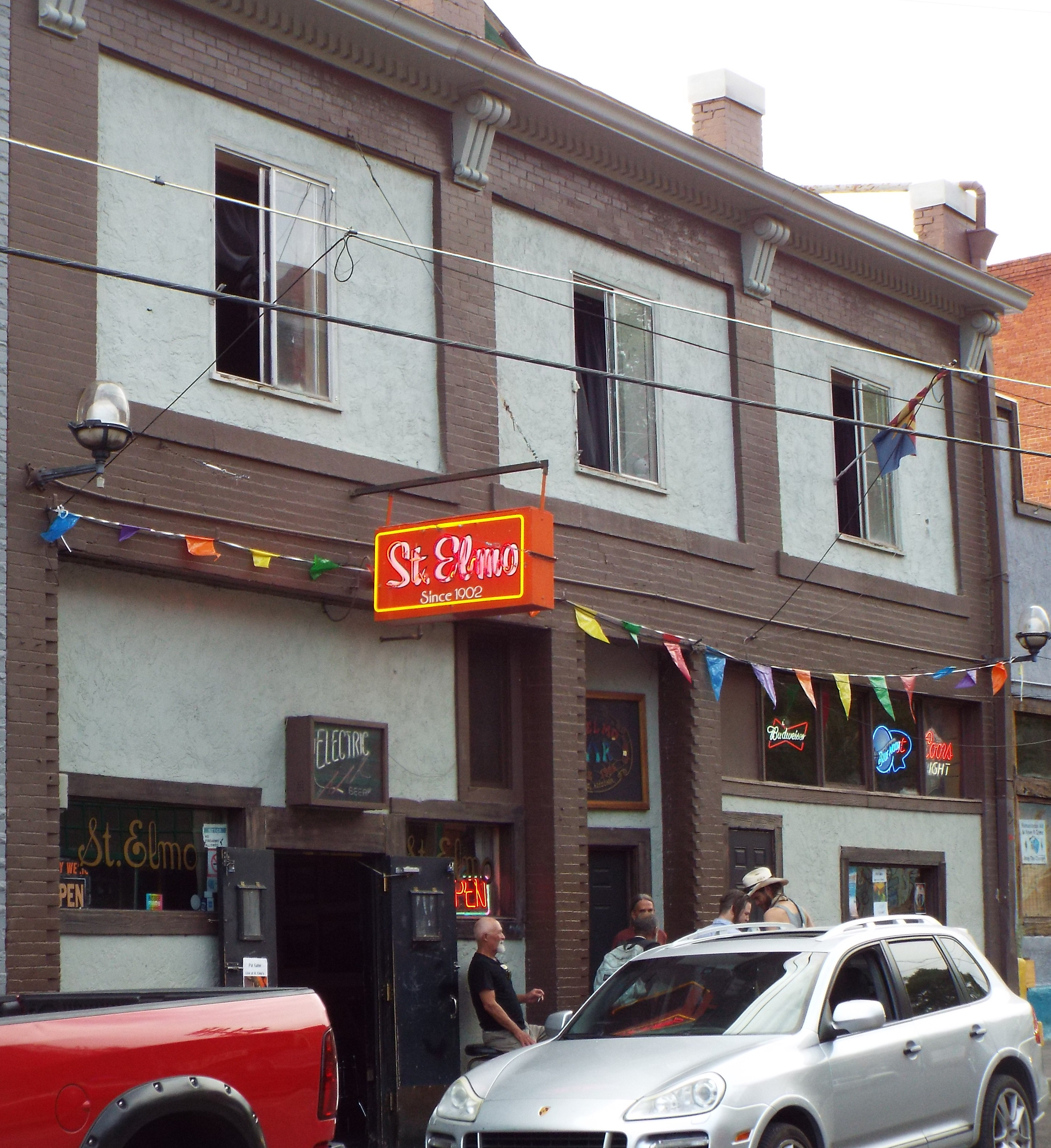
St. Elmo Bar

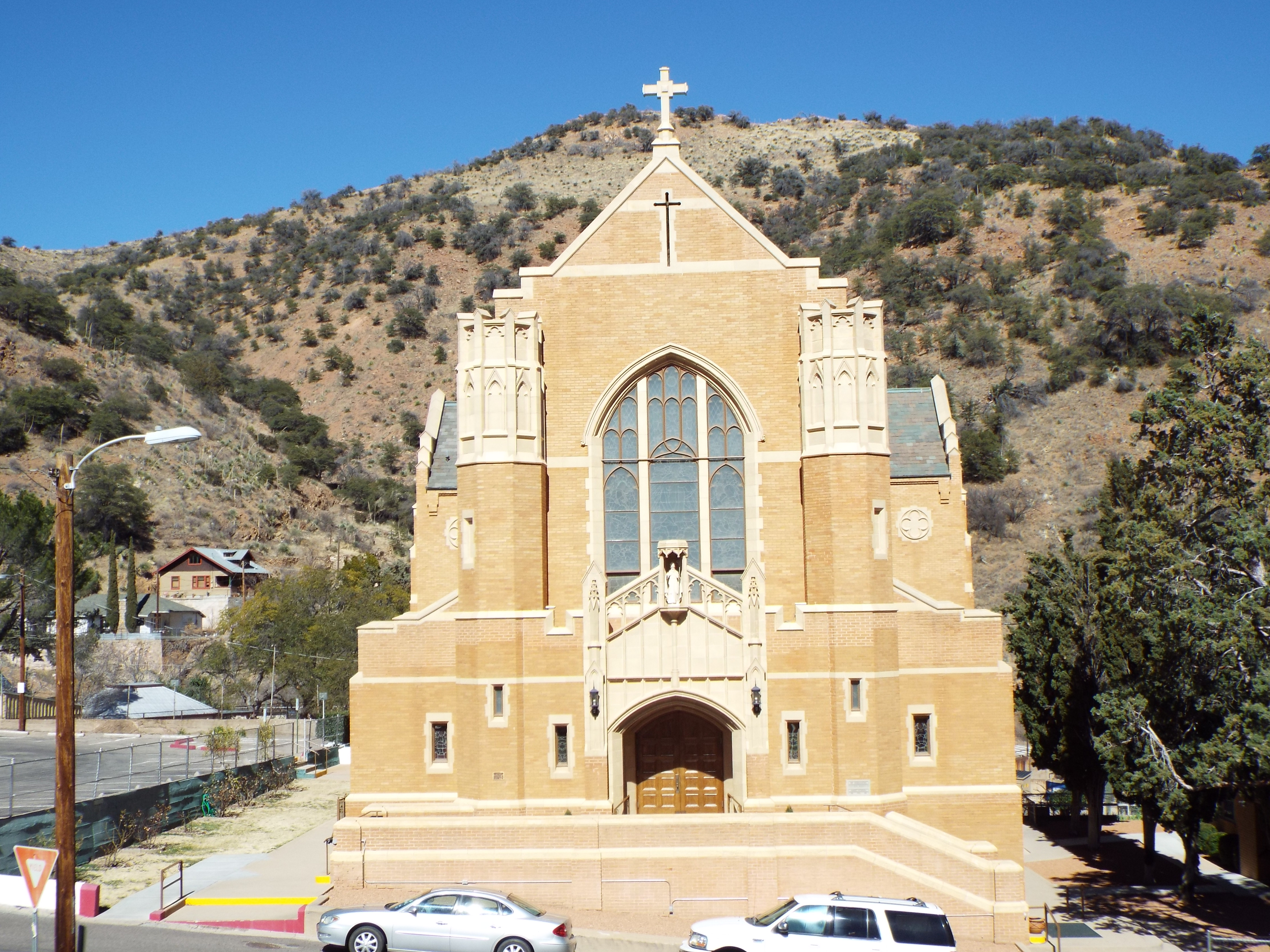
St. Patrick’s Roman Catholic Church.

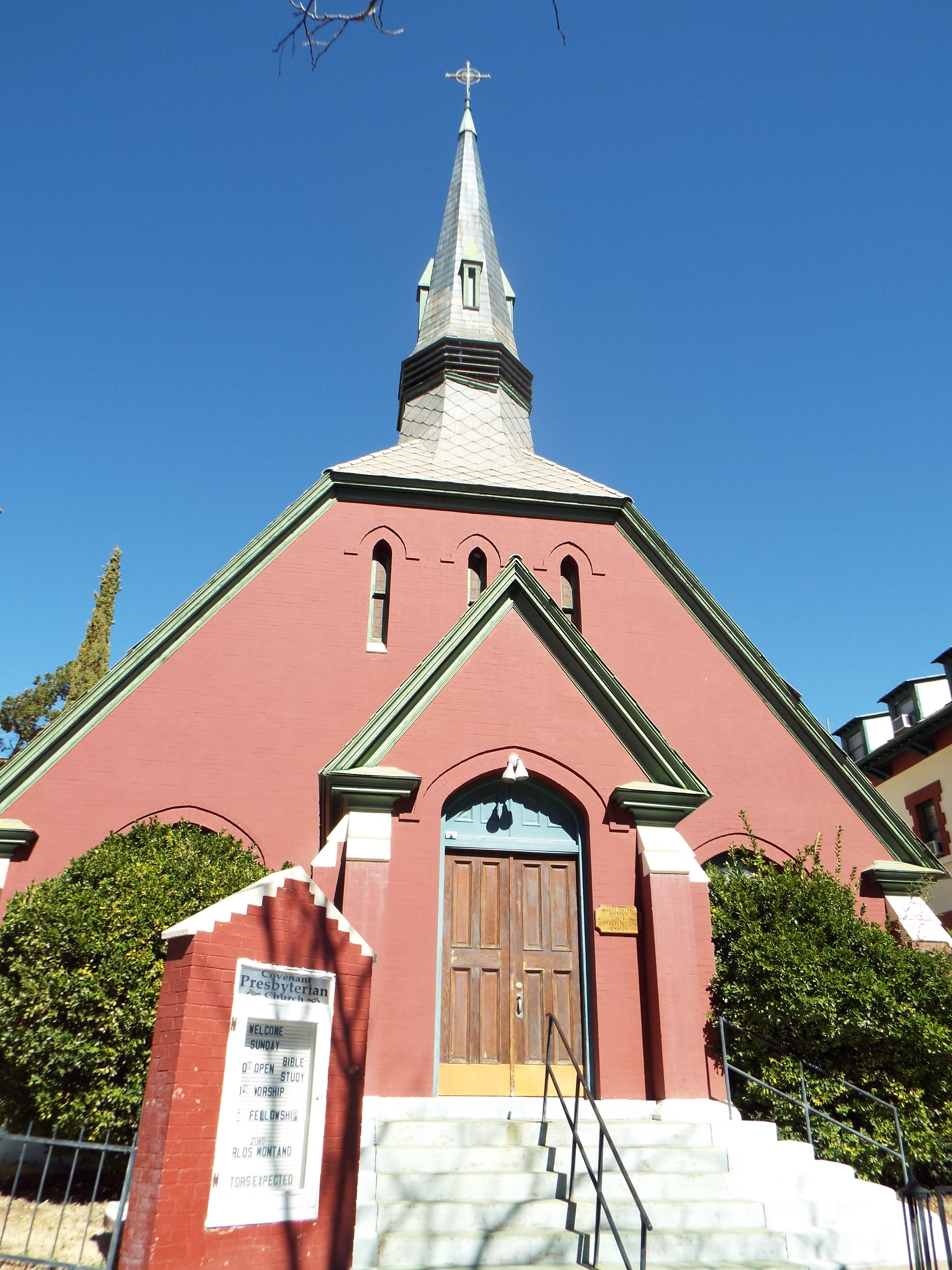
The Presbyterian Church.

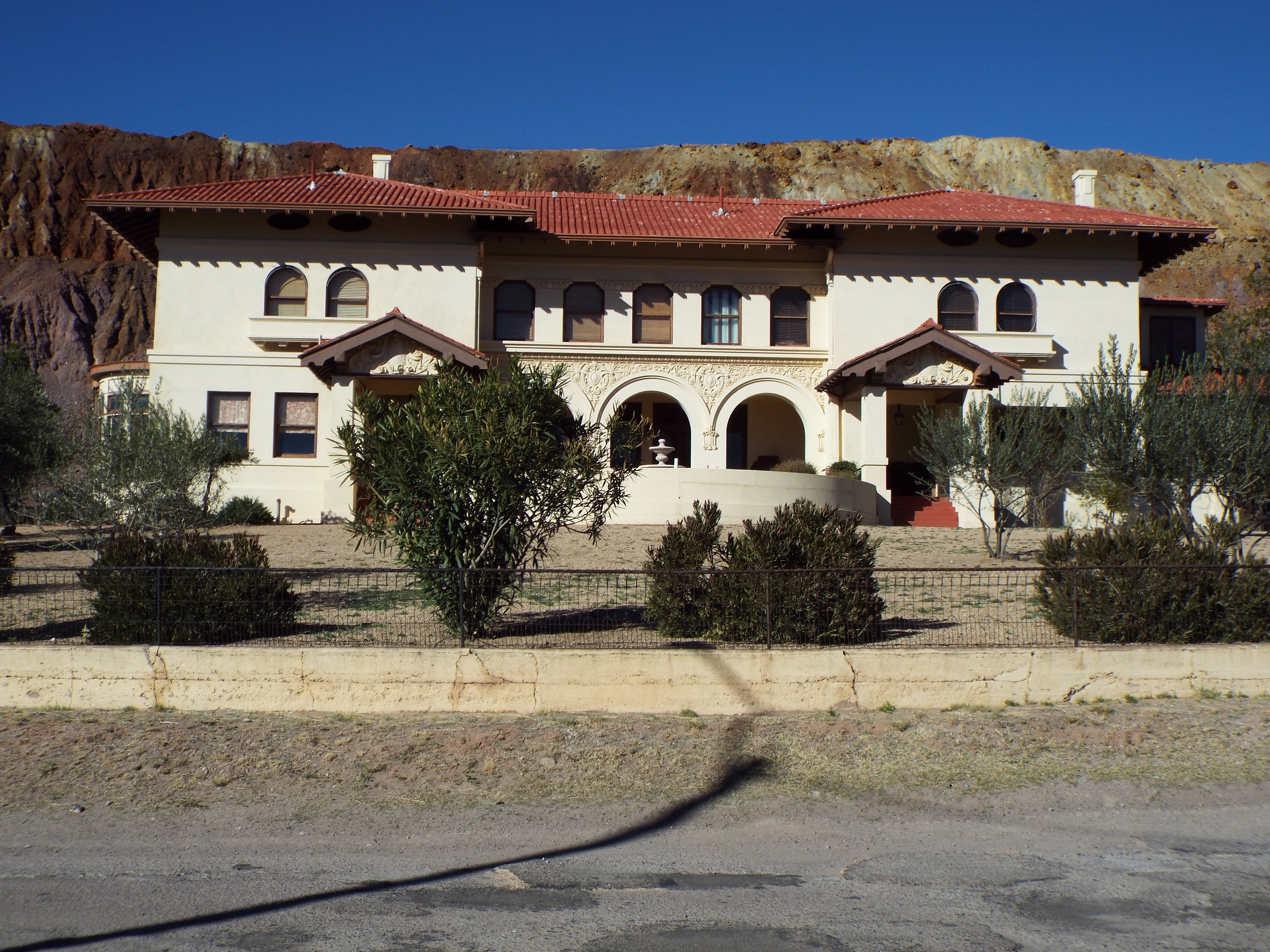
The Walter Douglas House.

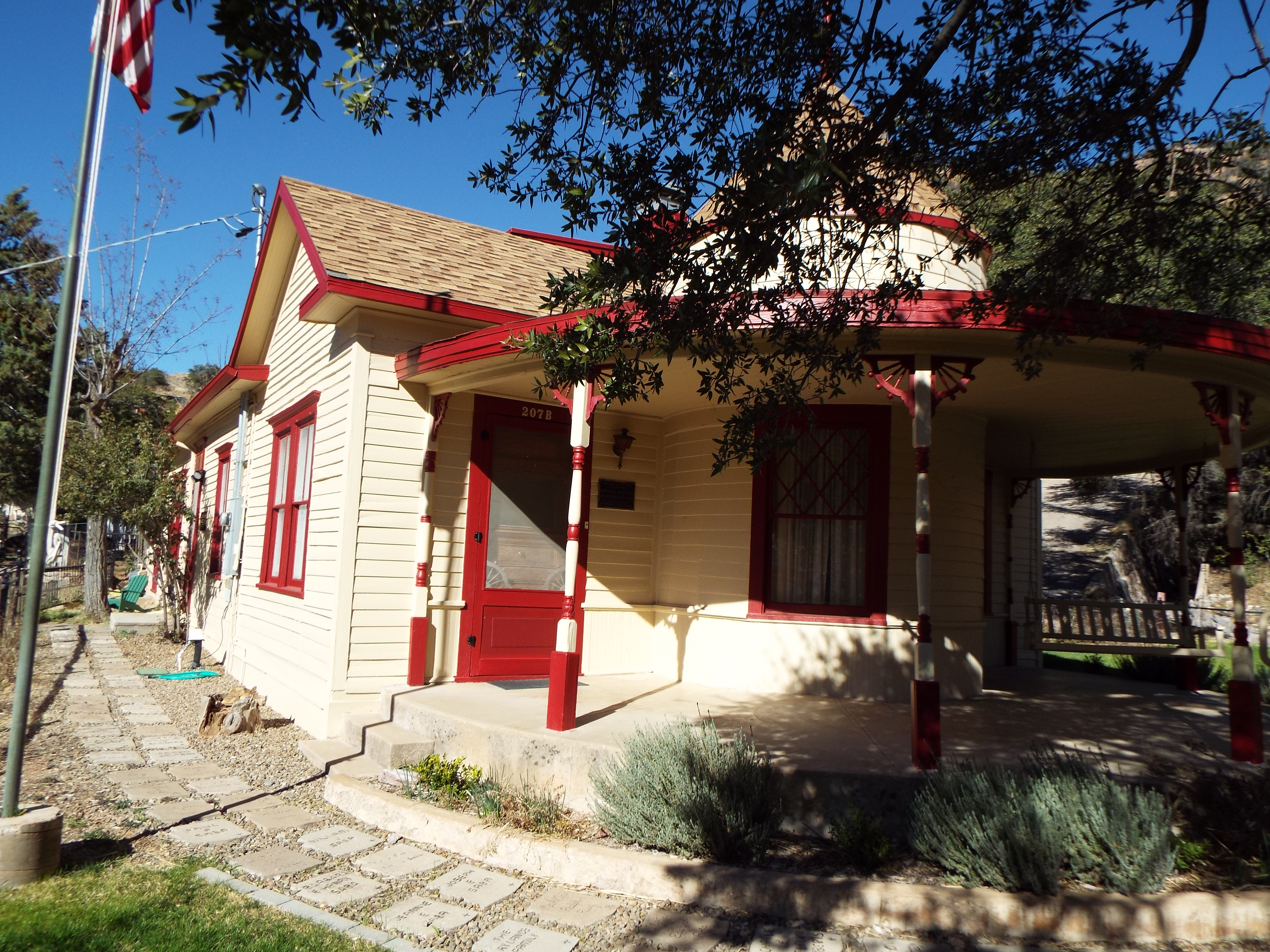
The Muheim House.

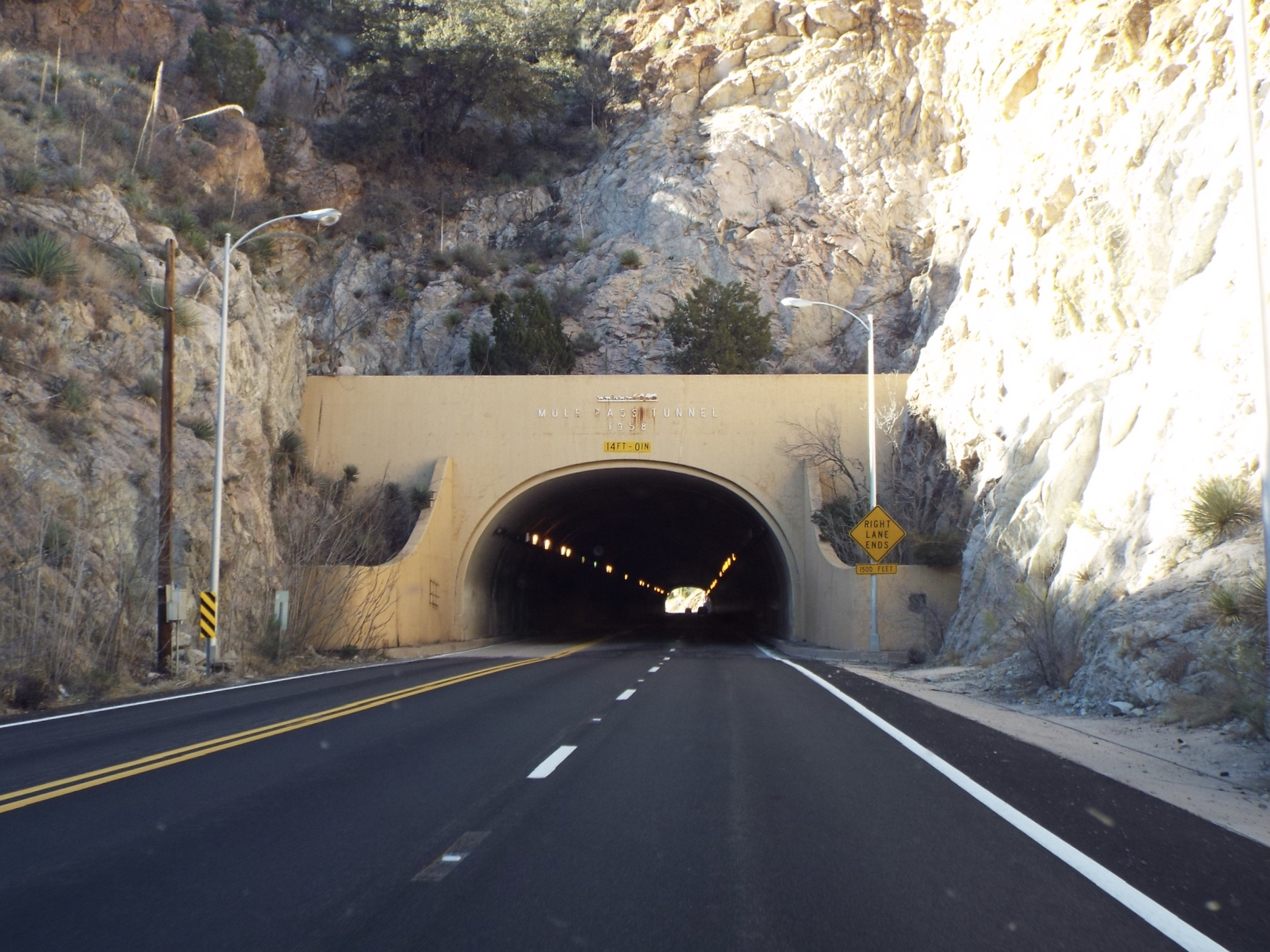
The Mule Pass Tunnel.

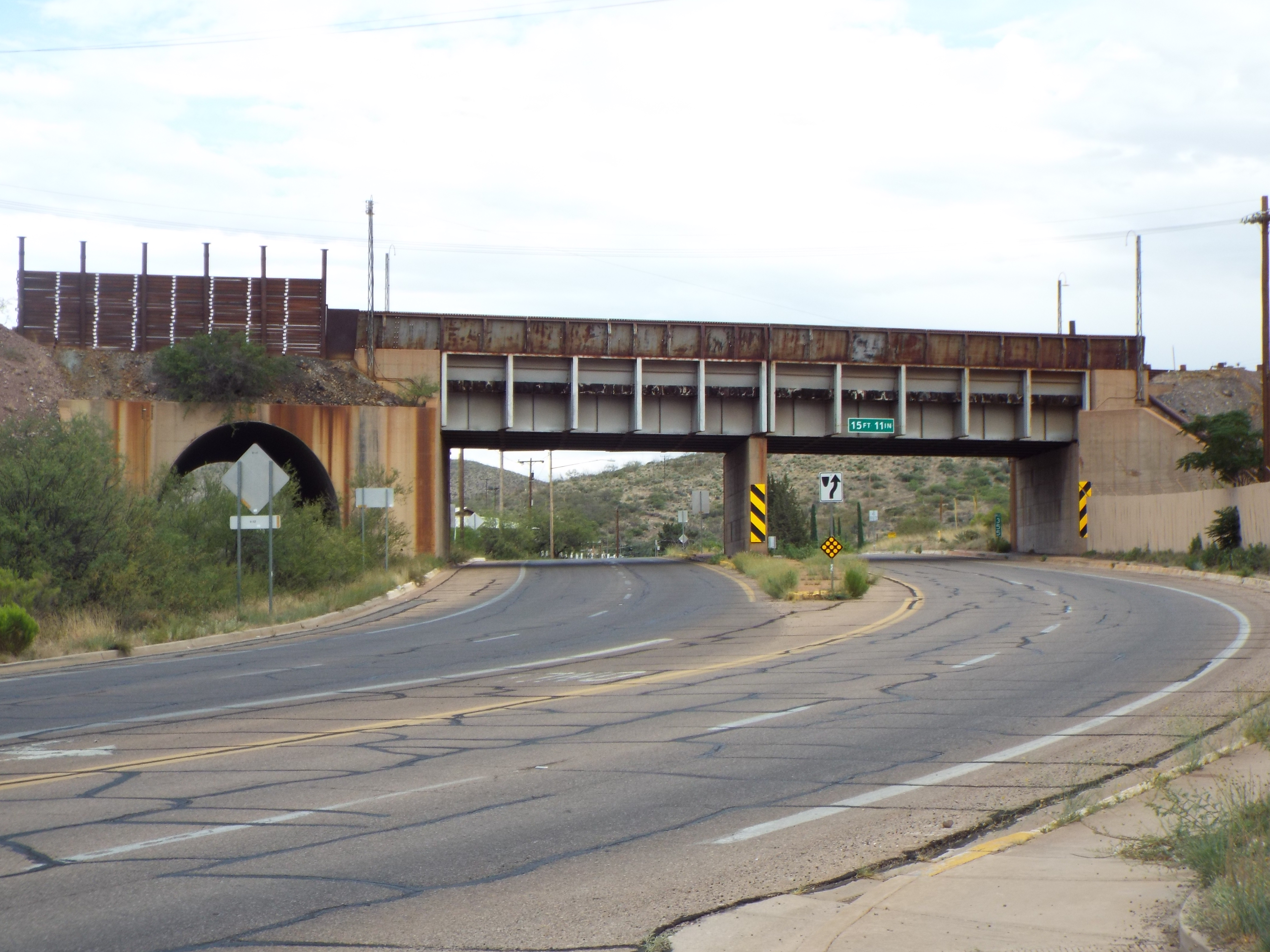
San Pedro Valley Railroad Overpass'

=== Warren Ballpark ===
The historic Warren Ballpark was built by the mining companies and is still in use today. The following is a brief description of the images posted.

- The Original Ticket Booth – the booth was made of wood. The Warren Ballpark was built in 1909 and is located at the corner of Arizona Street and Ruppe Road. The ballpark is one of the oldest professional baseball stadiums in the United States. It has hosted baseball Hall of Famers John McGraw, Connie Mack and Honus Wagner and also some of the members of the Chicago White Sox involved in the 1919 Black Sox Scandal, such as Hal Chase, Chick Gandil and Buck Weaver. The ballpark was listed in the National Register of Historic Places on October 15, 2010, as part of the Bisbee Residential Historic District, reference #10000233.
- The original concrete grandstand of the ballpark.
- Underneath the grandstand of the ballpark are housed the concrete dugouts, locker rooms, showers and manager's office.
- View of the Warren Ballpark concrete grandstand and home plate.
Historic Warren Ballpark

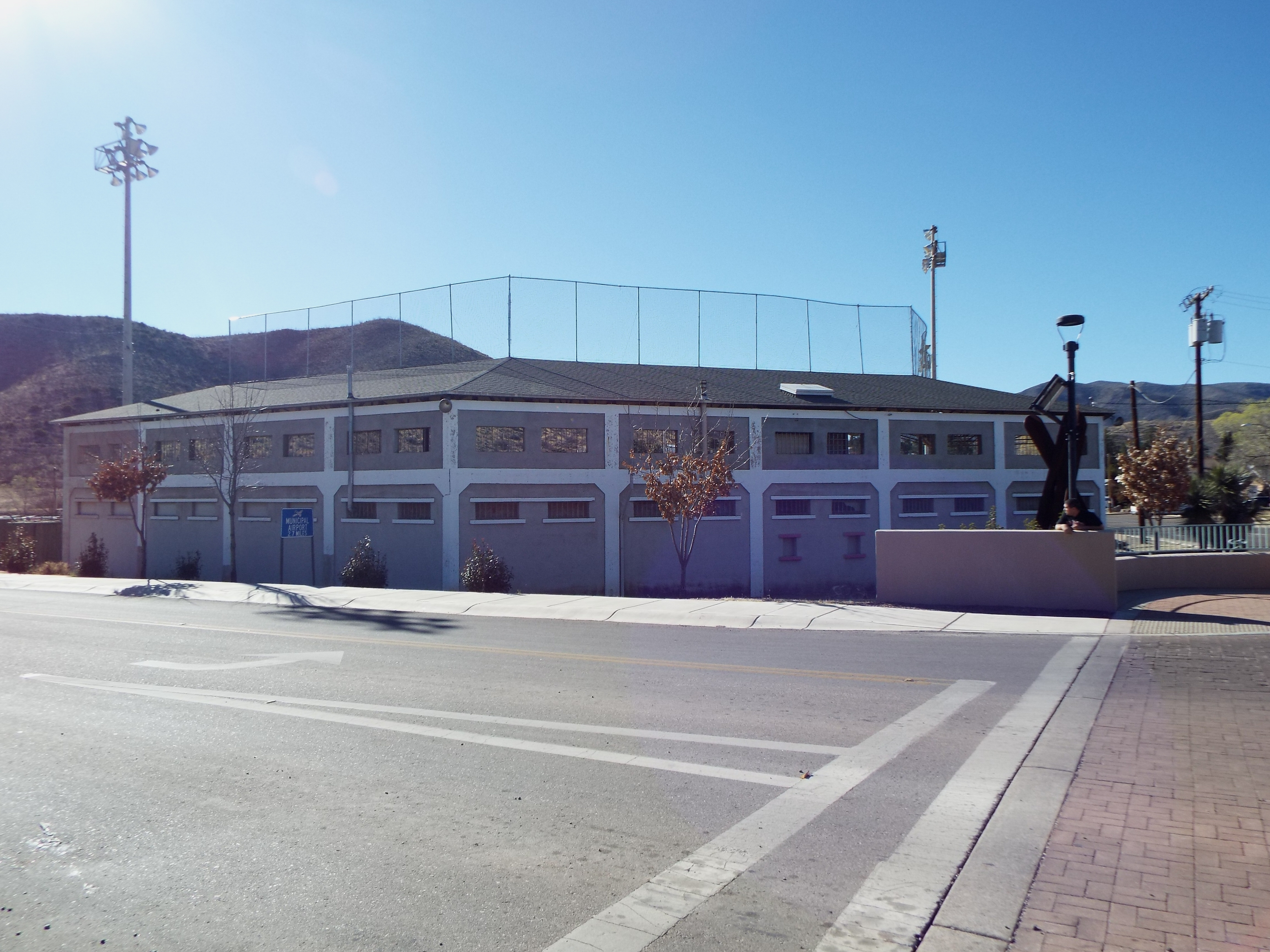
The Historic Warren Ballpark built in 1909

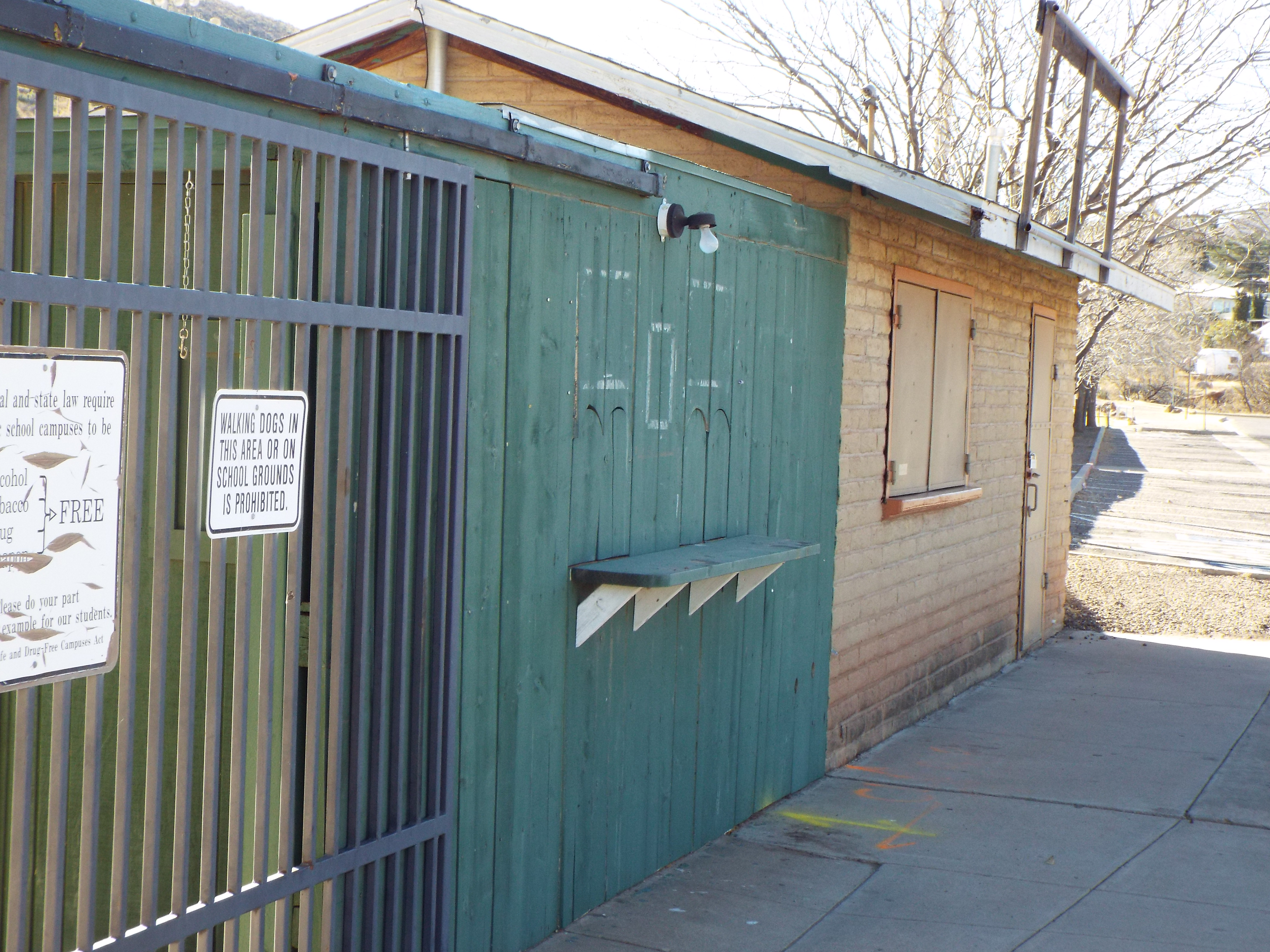
The Original Ticket Booth.

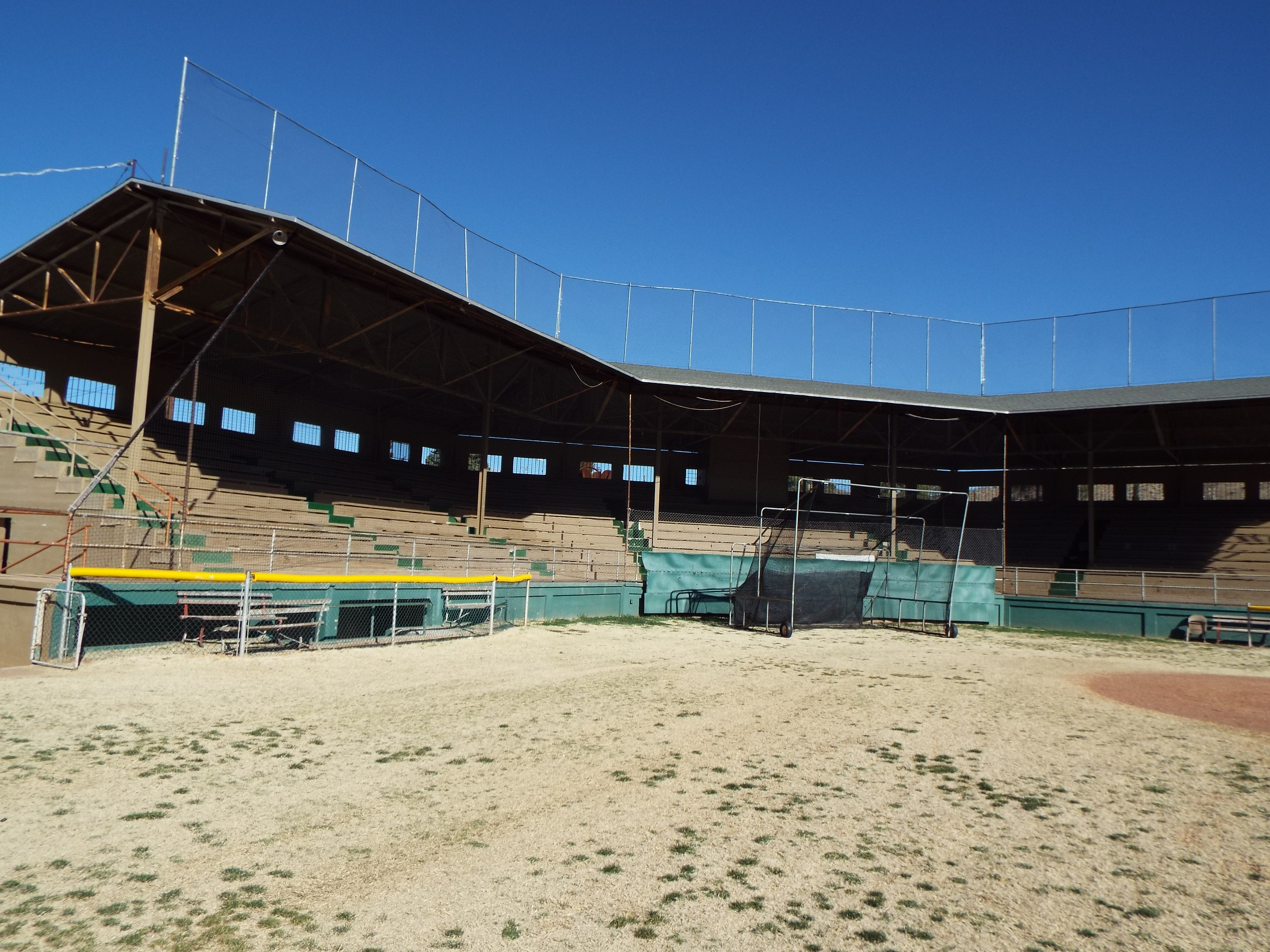
The Concrete Grandstand.

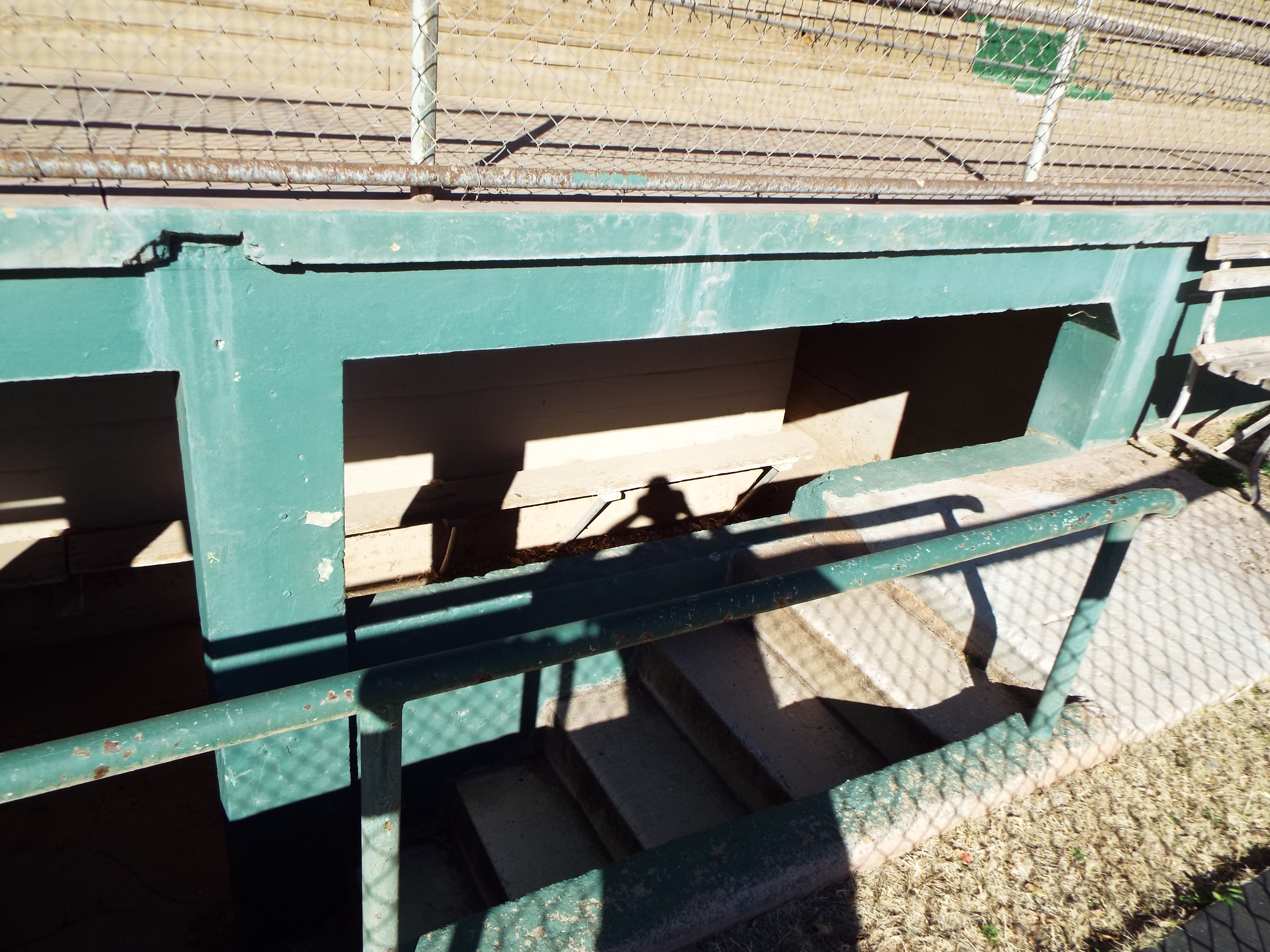
Underneath the grandstand of the Warren Ballpark are housed the concrete dugouts, locker rooms, showers and manager’s office.

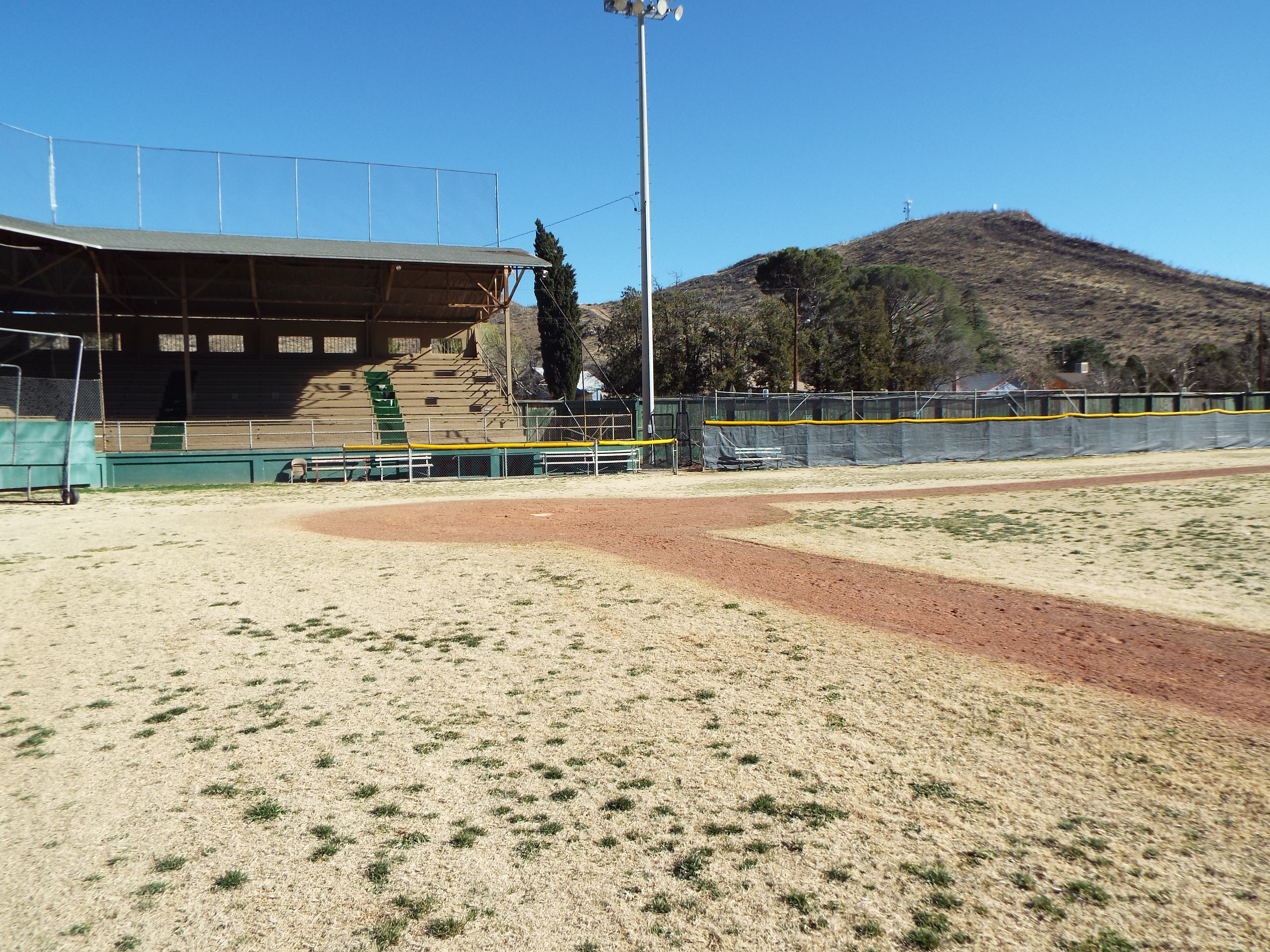
Concrete grandstand and home plate.

== Lavender Pit ==
The Lavender Pit is a former open pit copper, gold and silver mine which the Phelps Dodge Corporation opened in 1950. The Lavender Pit was named in honor of Harrison M. Lavender who was a vice president and General Manager of Phelps Dodge Corporation.

The Lavender Pit

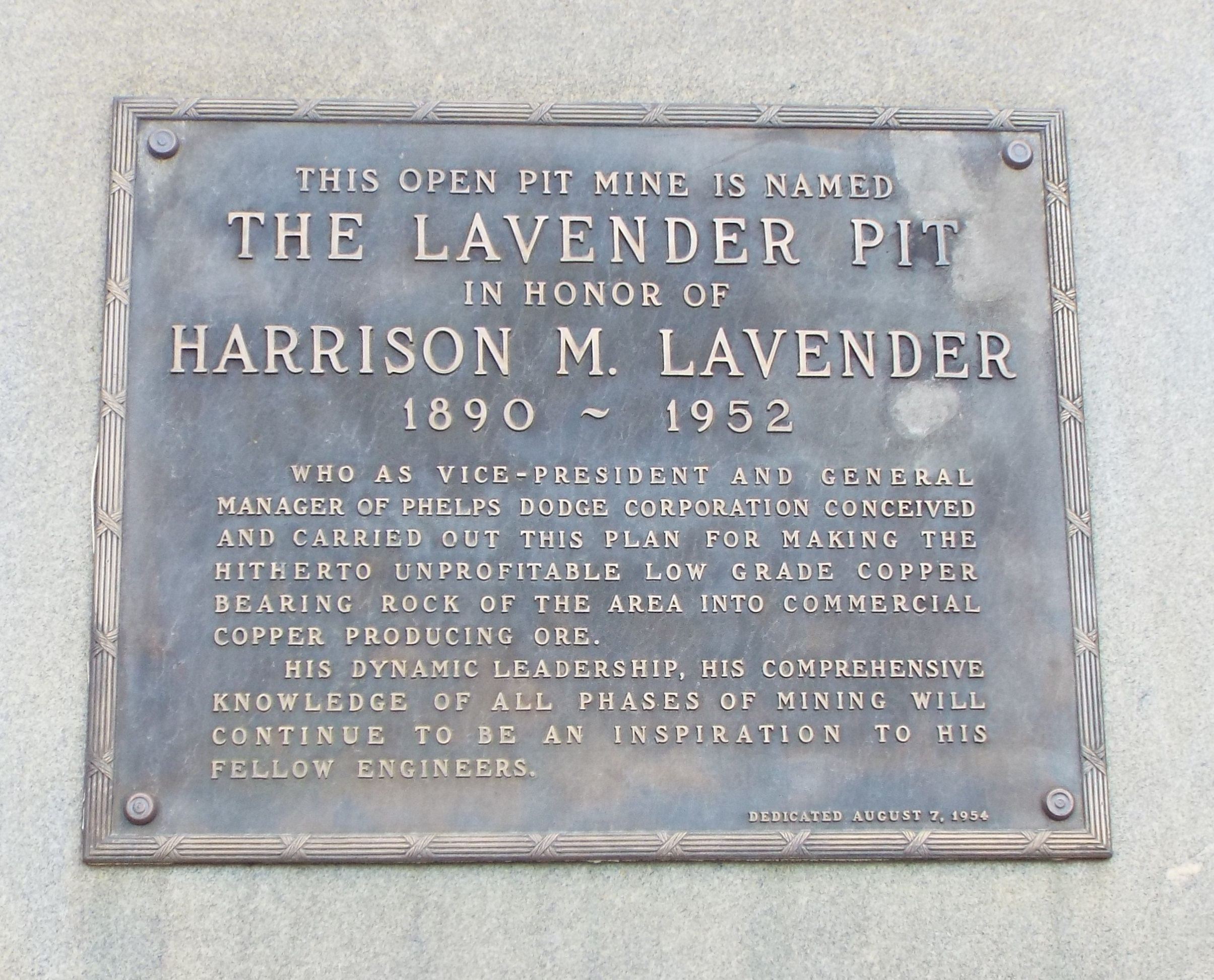
The Lavender Pit marker

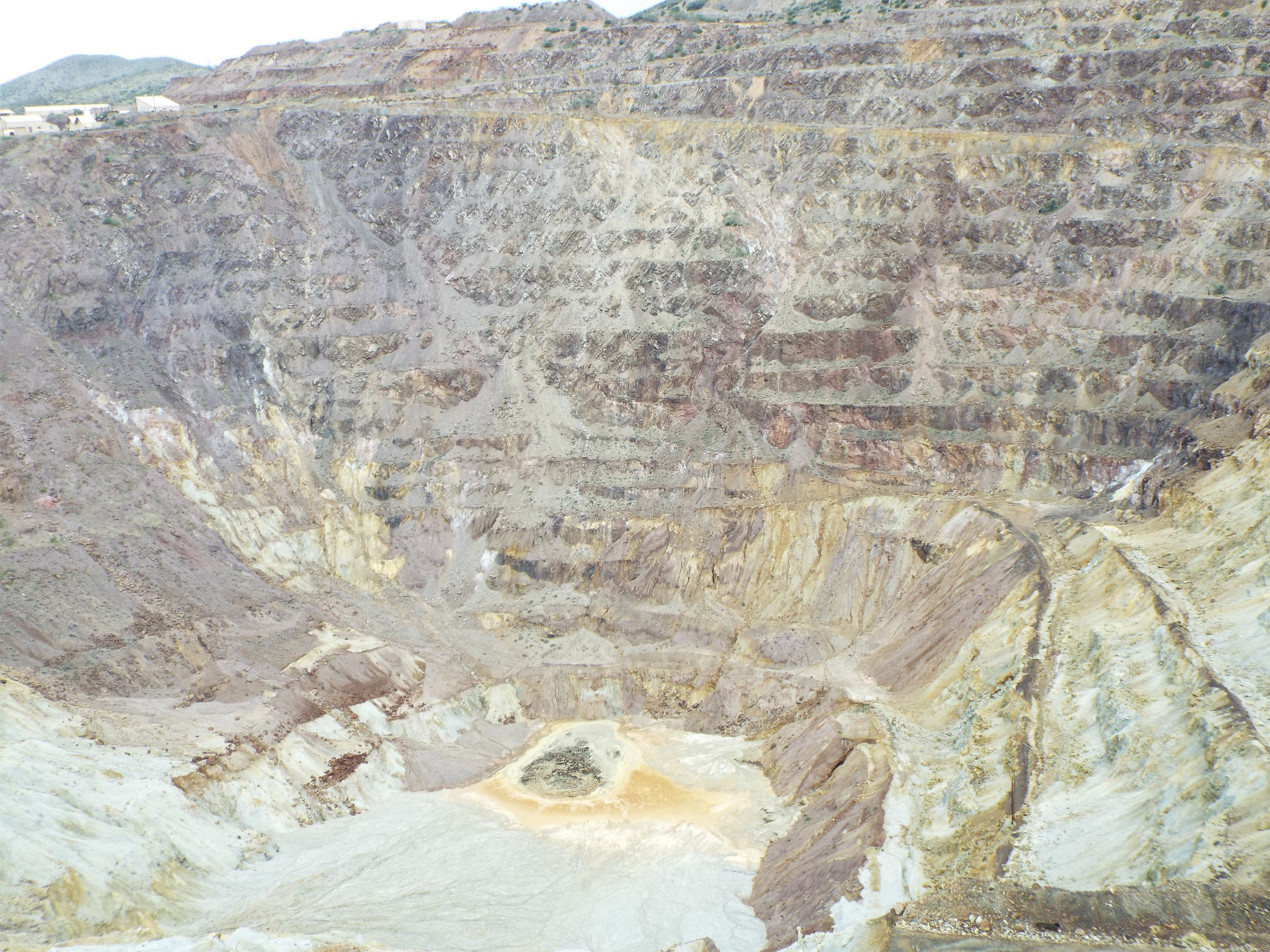
The Lavender Pit

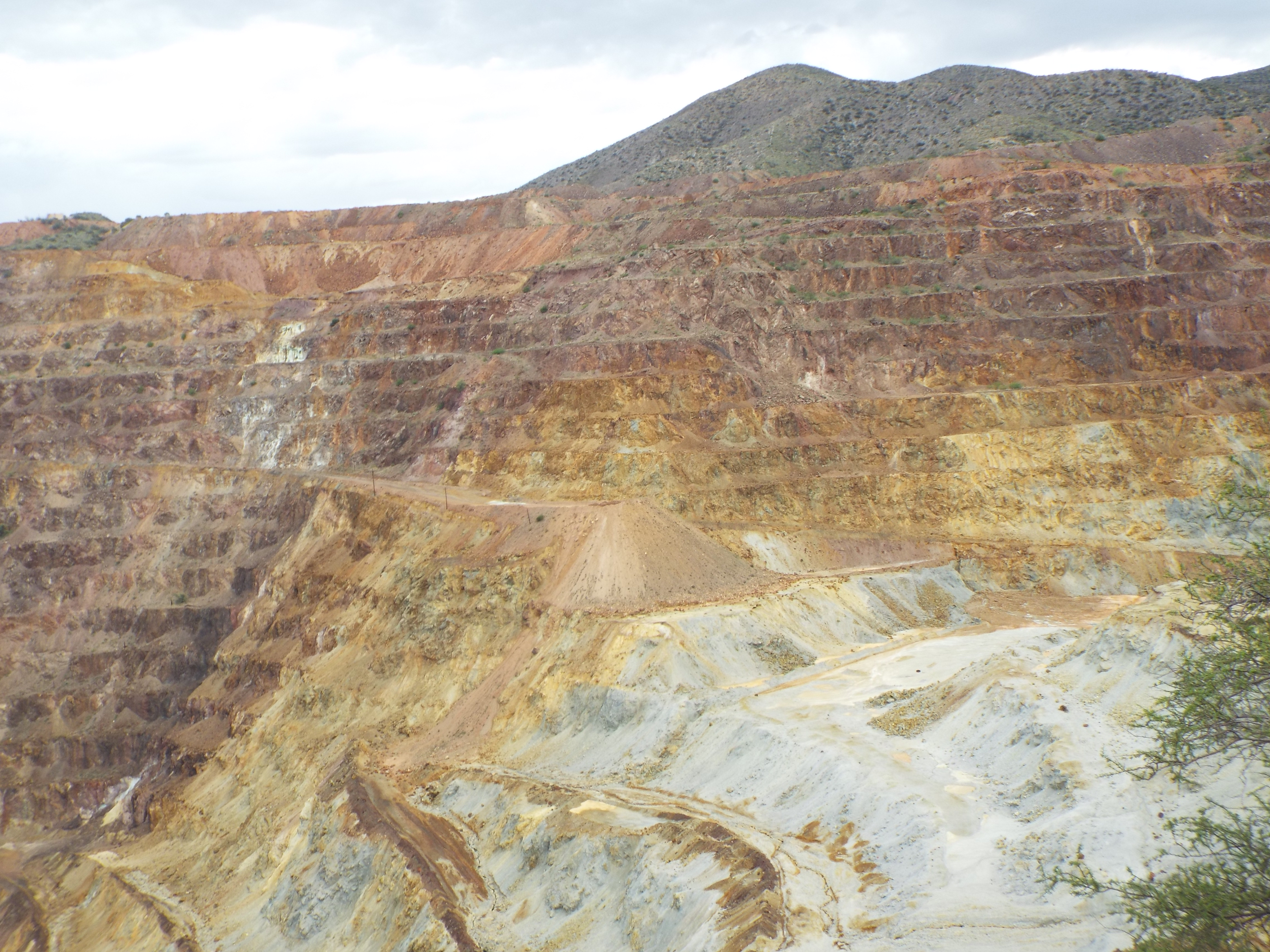
Different view of the Lavender Pit

== See also ==
- Bisbee, Arizona
- Bisbee Massacre
- National Register of Historic Places listings in Cochise County, Arizona
