= C. S. Fly =

American photographer (1849–1901)

Camillus Sydney "Buck" Fly
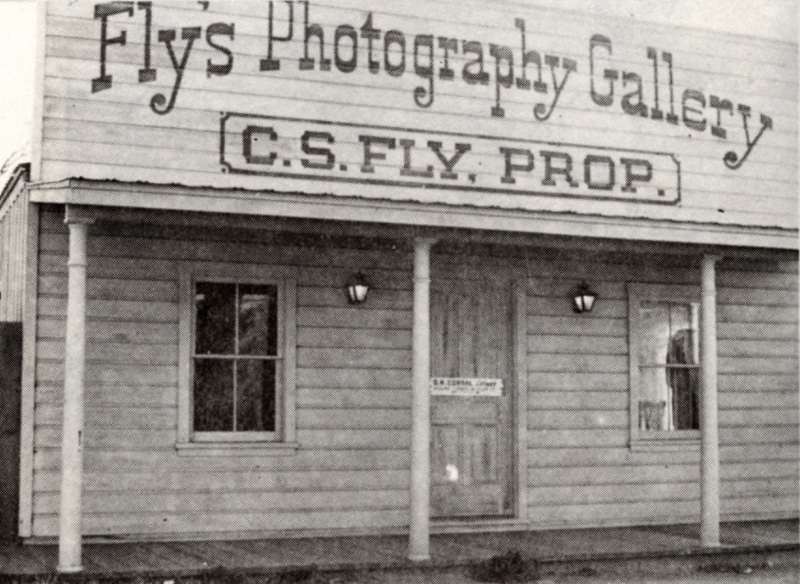
- Fly's photography studio, photographed by Fly himself
- Born: May 2, 1849; Andrew County, Missouri, U.S.
- Died: October 12, 1901 (aged 52); Bisbee, Arizona, U.S.
- Occupations: Photographer, marshal
- Years active: 1879–1897
- Spouse: Mary "Mollie" E. Goodrich
- Children: Coral "Kitty" Henry (adopted)

Camillus "Buck" Sydney Fly (May 2, 1849 – October 12, 1901) was an American photographer who is regarded by some as an early photojournalist and who captured the only known images of Native Americans while they were still at war with the United States. He took many other pictures of life in the silver-mining boom town of Tombstone, Arizona, and the surrounding region. He recognized the value of his photographs to illustrate periodicals of the day and took his camera to the scenes of important events where he recorded them and resold pictures to editors nationwide.

He was an eyewitness on October 26, 1881, to the Gunfight at the O.K. Corral, which took place outside his photography studio. He took pictures of a number of Tombstone residents including Tombstone founder Ed Schieffelin, pioneer surgeon Dr. George E. Goodfellow, and others.

He served as Cochise County Sheriff from 1895 to 1897. Most of his negatives were destroyed by two fires that burned his studio to the ground. His widow, photographer Mary E. "Mollie" Fly, donated his remaining images to the Smithsonian Museum before she died in 1925. His photographs are legendary and highly prized.

== Early life ==
His parents were originally from Andrew County, Missouri. Shortly after Camillus' birth, his family migrated to California, eventually settling in Napa County. He became a farmer and on September 29, 1879, he married Mary ("Mollie") (née McKie) Goodrich in San Francisco. Both were skillful photographers. She had previously been married to Samuel D. Goodrich but divorced him after two years. They left California and arrived in the booming silver-mining town of Tombstone, Arizona Territory in December 1879.

== Life in Tombstone ==
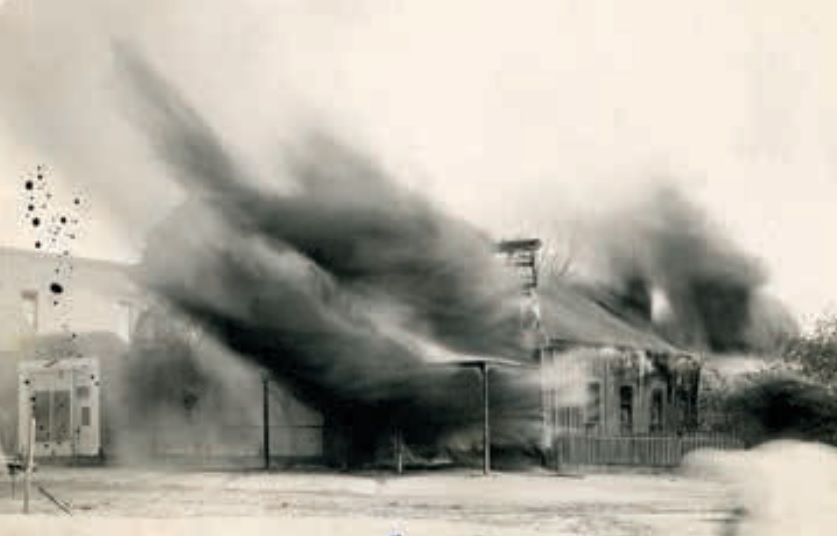
An image of the photography studio of C S. and Mollie Fly burning in 1912, taken by Mollie Fly.

In Tombstone they immediately opened a temporary photography studio in a tent. In July, 1880, they completed construction on a 12-room boarding house at 312 Fremont Street in Tombstone that housed their photography studio and gallery in the back, called the "Fly Gallery". Mollie Fly actively managed Fly's Gallery when her husband was away. She was one of the few female photographers of the era, taking pictures of anyone who could pay the studio price of 35 cents. It's unknown how they divided photographic duties between them, although all known photographs are attributed to him.

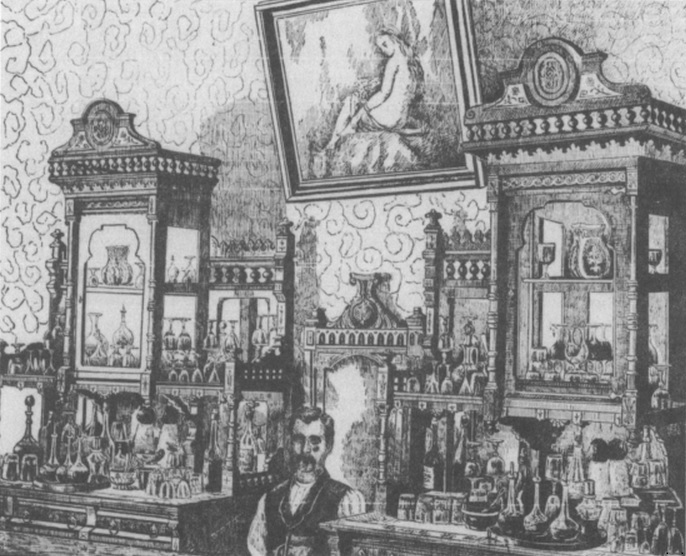
The Alhambra Saloon of Tombstone, Arizona Territory, in an engraving of a picture taken by C.S. Fly. The image first appeared in The Arizona Quarterly Illustrated in July 1880.

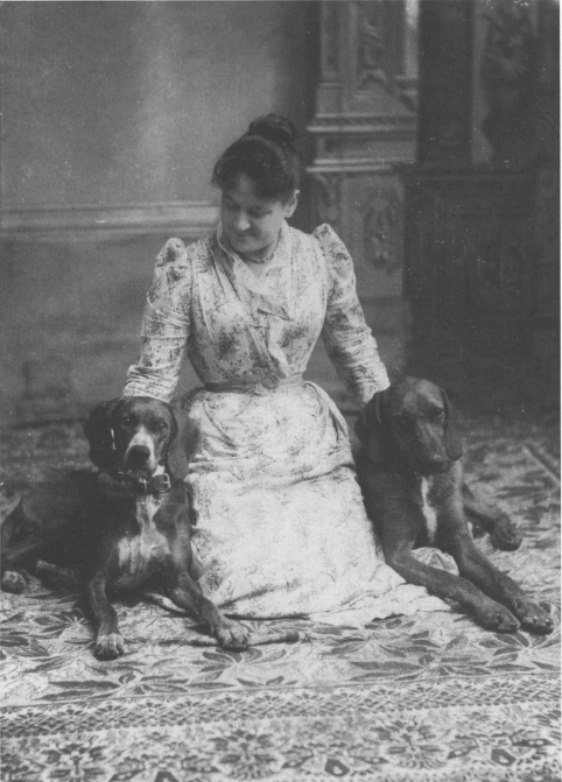
Mary ("Mollie") (née McKie) Goodrich Fly was a photographer before she married C.S. Fly in San Francisco. They arrived in Tombstone, Arizona Territory in December 1879.

Fly had a brother Webster who was also a photographer. Webster lived with Buck and Mary from June 4, 1880, through to at least June 1882.

In June 1880, Fly partnered with C. A. Halstead in a studio at the Harshaw mining camp near the Mexican border. Veteran journalist Thomas Gardiner, publisher of The Arizona Quarterly Illustrated, was seeking contributions and welcomed Fly's photographs. The premier July 1880 issue featured two of Fly's photographs as engravings.

On October 26, 1881, the Gunfight at the O.K. Corral occurred in an alley adjacent to his studio and boarding house. During the shootout, Ike Clanton ran away from the gunfight, telling Wyatt Earp that he was unarmed, and hid in their studio. Fly, armed with a Henry rifle, disarmed Billy Clanton as he lay dying against the house next door. On November 6, 1894, Fly was elected Cochise County sheriff, and served until January 1897.

Fly and Mollie temporarily raised a girl named Kitty, though it's not known whether she was adopted or was from another relationship. Mollie ran the boarding house and studio while her husband traveled around the region taking photographs.

=== Pictures of Geronimo ===
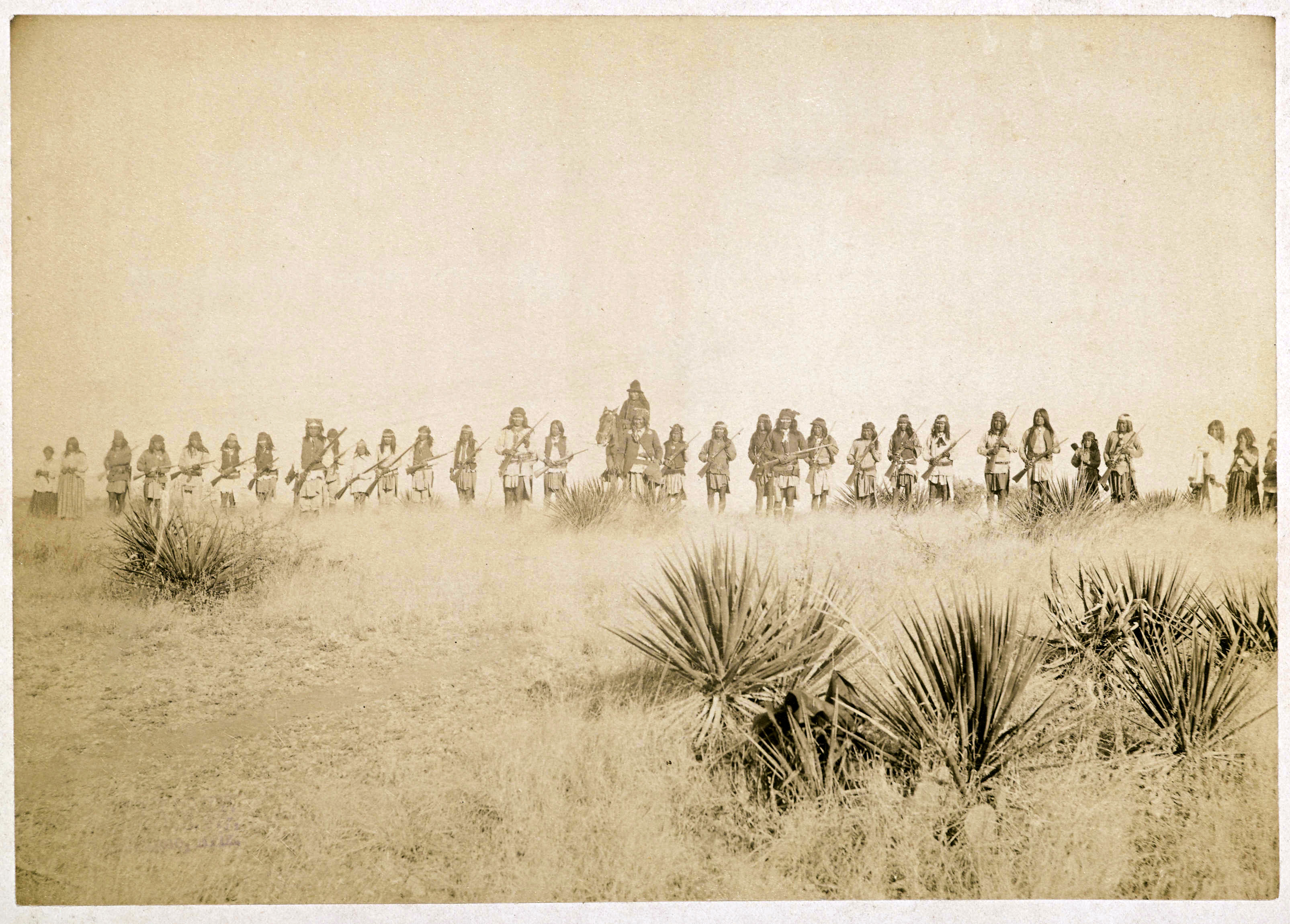
"Scene in Geronimo's camp, the Apache outlaw and murderer. Taken before the surrender to Gen. Crook, March 27, 1886, in the Sierra Madre mountains of Mexico, escaped March 30, 1886."

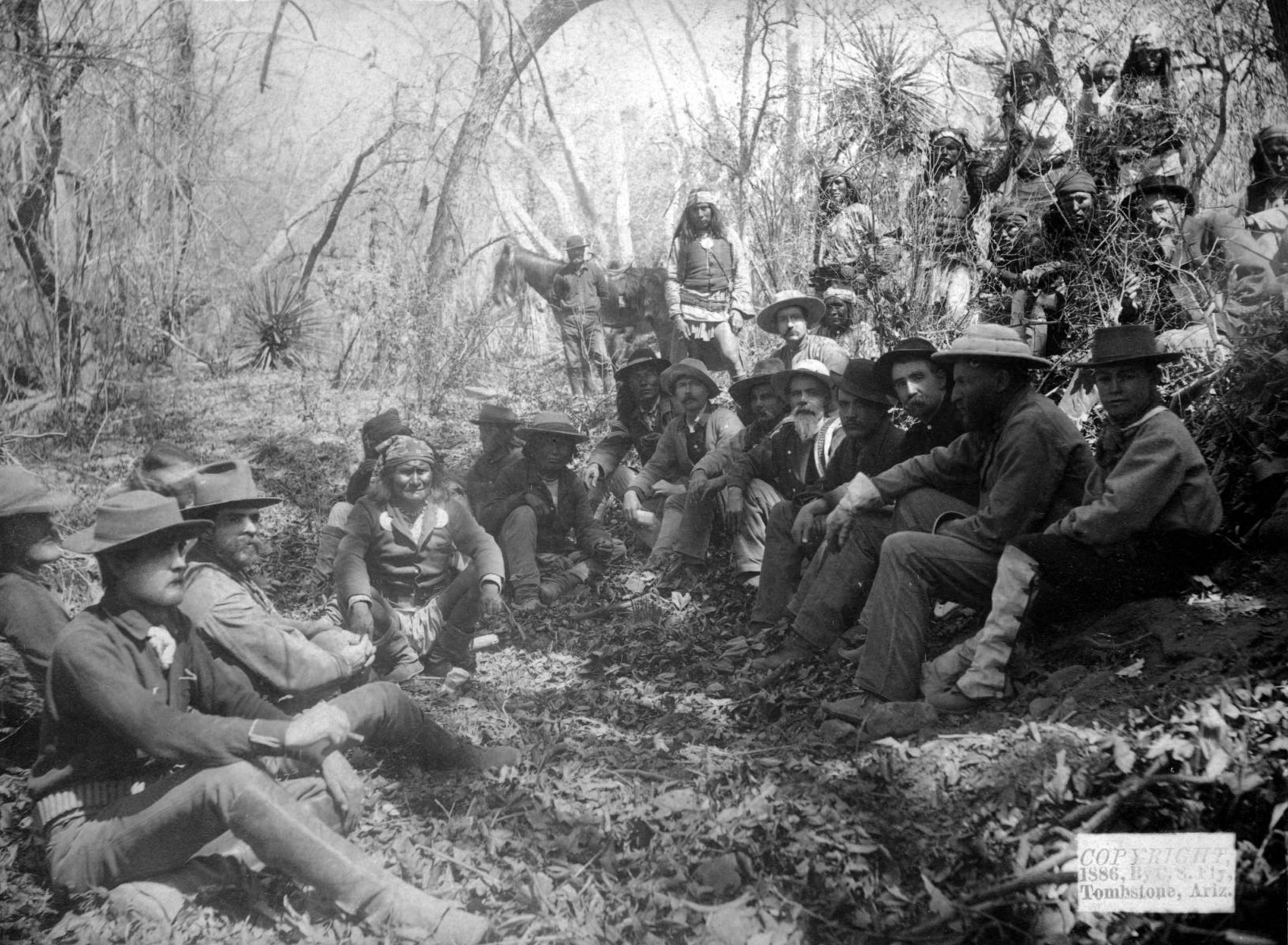
"Geronimo poses with members of his tribe and General George Crook's staff during peace negotiations on March 27, 1886."

In March, 1886, Department of Arizona General George Crook received word that the Apache leader Geronimo would meet him in Cañon de los Embudos, in the Sierra Madre Mountains about 86 miles (138 km) from Fort Bowie. Fly learned of the meeting and on March 20, 1886, took his equipment and attached himself to the military column. During the three days of negotiations, Fly took about 15 exposures on 8-by-10-inch glass negatives.

One of the pictures of Geronimo with two of his sons standing alongside was made at Geronimo's request. Fly's images are the only existing photographs of Geronimo's surrender. He coolly posed his subjects, asking them to move and turn their heads and faces, to improve his composition.

John Bourke described how Fly took the historic photographs:

Tombstone photographer Fly kept busy with his camera, posing his Apache models with a nerve that would have reflected undying glory on a Chicago drummer. He coolly asked Geronimo and the warriors with him to change positions, and turn their heads or faces, to improve the negative. None of them seemed to mind him in the least except Chihuahua, who kept dodging behind a tree, but at last caught by the dropping of the slide.

The Mayor of Tucson, C. M. Strauss, was present. He later wrote that:

Fly is an excellent artist and he was not a respector of persons or circumstances, and even in the midst of the most serious interviews with the Indians, he would step up to an officer and say, 'just put your hat a little more on this side, General. No Geronimo, your right foot must rest on that stone,' etc., so wrapped was he in the artistic effect of his views.

Geronimo, who was camped on the Mexican side of the border, agreed to the surrender terms. A soldier who sold them whiskey said that his band would be murdered as soon as they crossed the border. Geronimo and 25 of his followers slipped away during the night, costing Crook his command.

=== Earthquake study ===
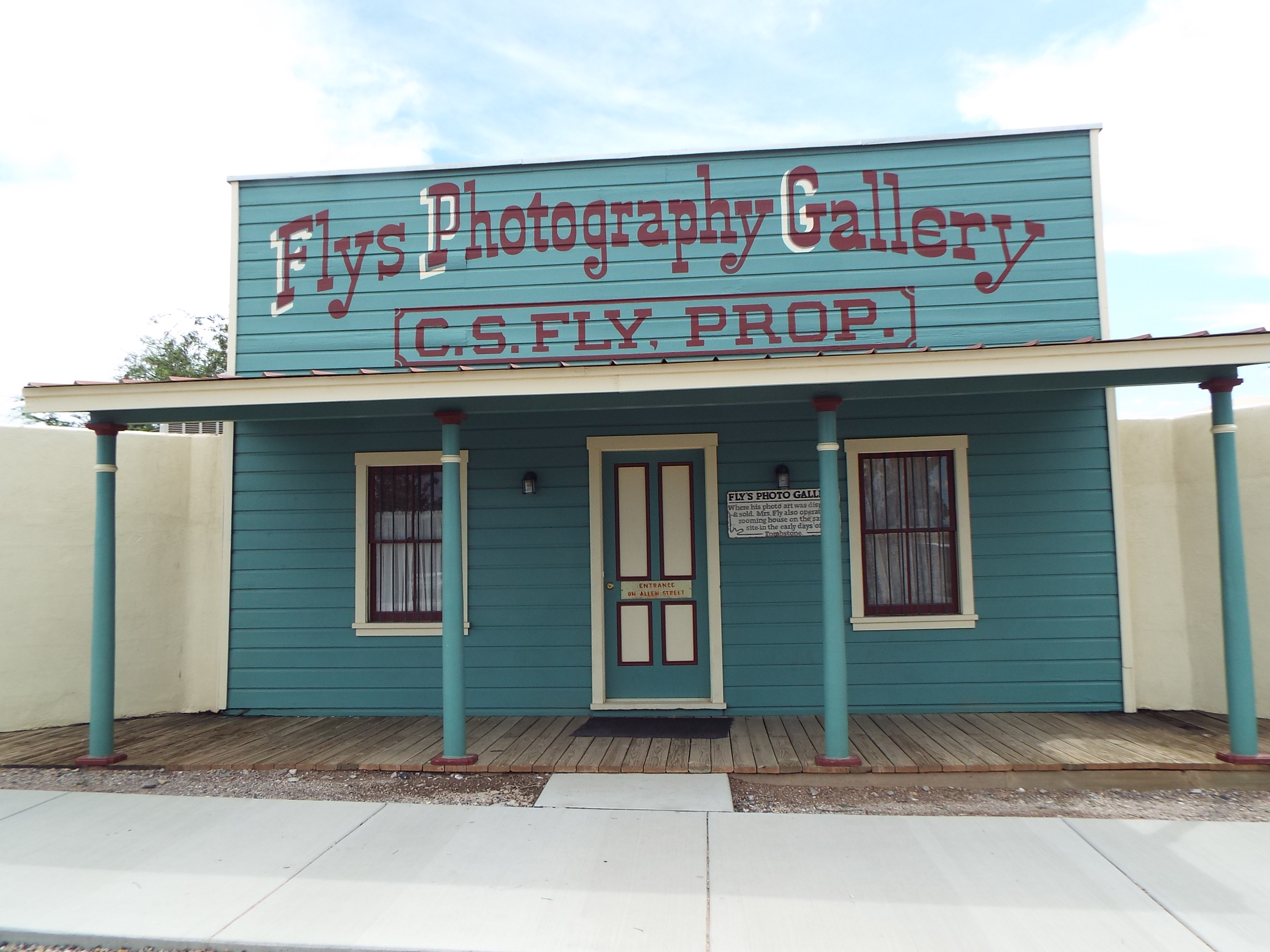
A modern reconstruction of Fly's photography studio in Tombstone, Arizona.

Fly became a heavy drinker and Molly briefly left him in Tombstone in 1887, taking Kitty with her to Florence. On May 3, 1887, a large earthquake struck Bavispe in Sonora, Mexico, destroying most of the adobe houses in Bavispe and killing 42 of the town's 700 residents. Tombstone Dr. George E. Goodfellow was fascinated by the earth movement and studied the earthquake's effects. He obtained a commission from the U.S. government to travel to the earthquake area, and on his second trip in July 1887 he brought C.S. Fly with him to help study and record the effects. They traveled over 700 miles (1,100 km) through the Sierra Madre mountains recording observations, mostly on foot. Goodfellow used Fly's images of the effects of the earthquake, the damaged and ruined buildings, and survivors to illustrate his report.

As the Tombstone mines played out or flooded, Fly traveled to Fort Huachuca and Bisbee to take photographs of soldiers on their payday. On December 17, 1887, he toured Arizona with his camera and photographs. When the Tombstone economy further deteriorated, Fly made extended trips to Bisbee and Phoenix where he operated temporary studios. The Tombstone Epitaph noted his departure: "Mr. C.S. Fly, the well known photographer, leaves today for Florence, Phoenix and other points in the Territory … During his absence, Mrs. Fly also an accomplished photographic artist, will conduct the gallery in this city as usual." In November, 1893, they moved to Phoenix and opened a studio there. When the business failed, Fly returned to Tombstone in 1894, and Fly accepted the Democratic nomination for Sheriff.

=== Role as photojournalist ===
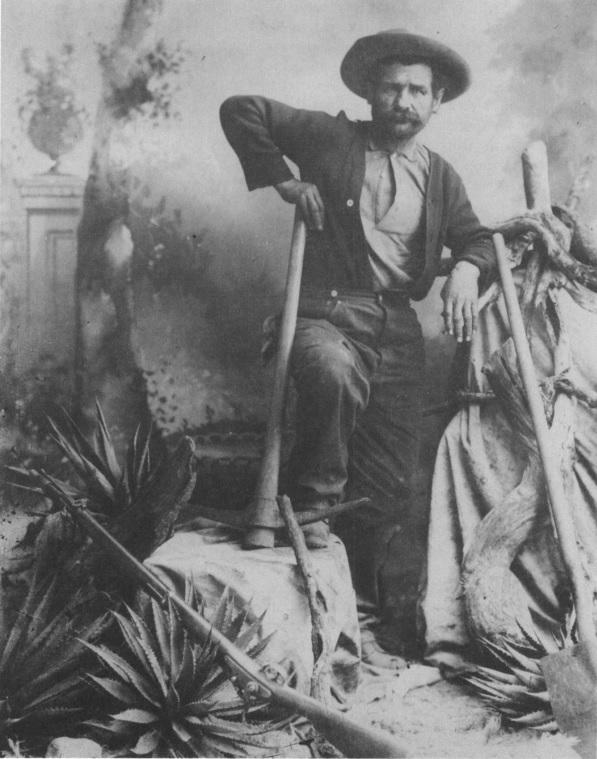
C.S. Fly's image of miner George Warren first appeared in Souvenir of Bisbee published in 1900. Fly's caption was, "Discoverer of the Copper Queen Mine."

More than a century before the idea of photojournalism was born, Fly apparently recognized the value of his images as illustrations and furnished high-quality prints to editors of journals, magazines, and newspapers. He sent 16 of his photographs of Geronimo and his Apache band to the popular publication Harper's Weekly, which published six of them in their April 24, 1886 issue, giving Fly nationwide exposure. His photos of Geronimo and the other free Apaches, taken on March 25 and 26th, are the only known photographs taken of an American Indian while still at war with the United States. Unlike most of his contemporaries, he wasn't content to remain in his portrait studio, and took his camera to the scenes of important events, where he deliberately recorded them as candidly as his limited technology allowed. Fly capitalized on the popularity of the images and hired assistants to fill orders for 50 cents each, or $4.00 per dozen.

Fly gained national attention again in 1888 when Frank Leslie's Illustrated Newspaper published four more of his images taken during his trip to Mexico with Goodfellow. In 1891, Charles Scribner's Sons of New York published On the Border with Crook by Captain John G. Bourke, who had accompanied Crook on the expedition. It included the image of Geronimo's warriors lined up on a hill, but using the new halftone process, the first time a Fly photograph was printed using this technique.

Though his drinking was becoming more and more heavy, he was elected as the Cochise County Sheriff in 1894 and served for two years. He chose not to run for Sheriff a second time in 1896. The town of Tombstone continued to suffer from a poor economy and he and Mollie relocated to the more prosperous industrial copper mining town of Bisbee. He produced pictures to illustrate the Copper King Mining Company's brochure in 1898. In 1900, the Arizona Graphic press printed Souvenir of Bisbee, the first tourist brochure for Bisbee, including pictures by Fly. The first image was Fly's picture of miner George Warren, the "discoverer of the Copper Queen Mine."

== Famous photographs ==
Geronimo and Gen. Crook at Cañon de Los Embudos, Sonora, March 27, 1886.

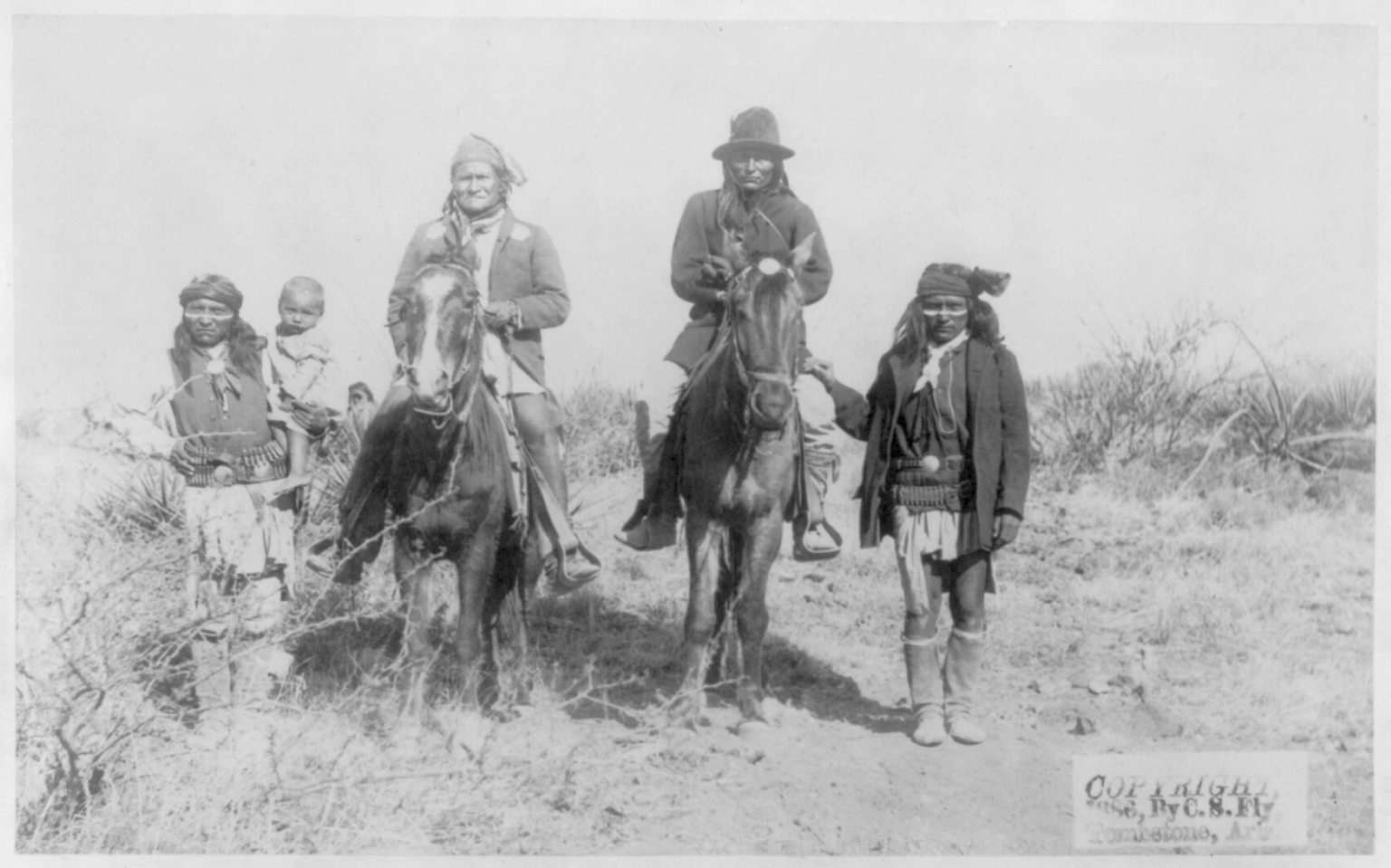
Geronimo, son, and two warriors. Originally captioned as "Geronimo's camp before surrender to General Crook, March 27, 1886: Geronimo and Natches mounted; Geronimo's son (Perico) standing at his side holding baby."

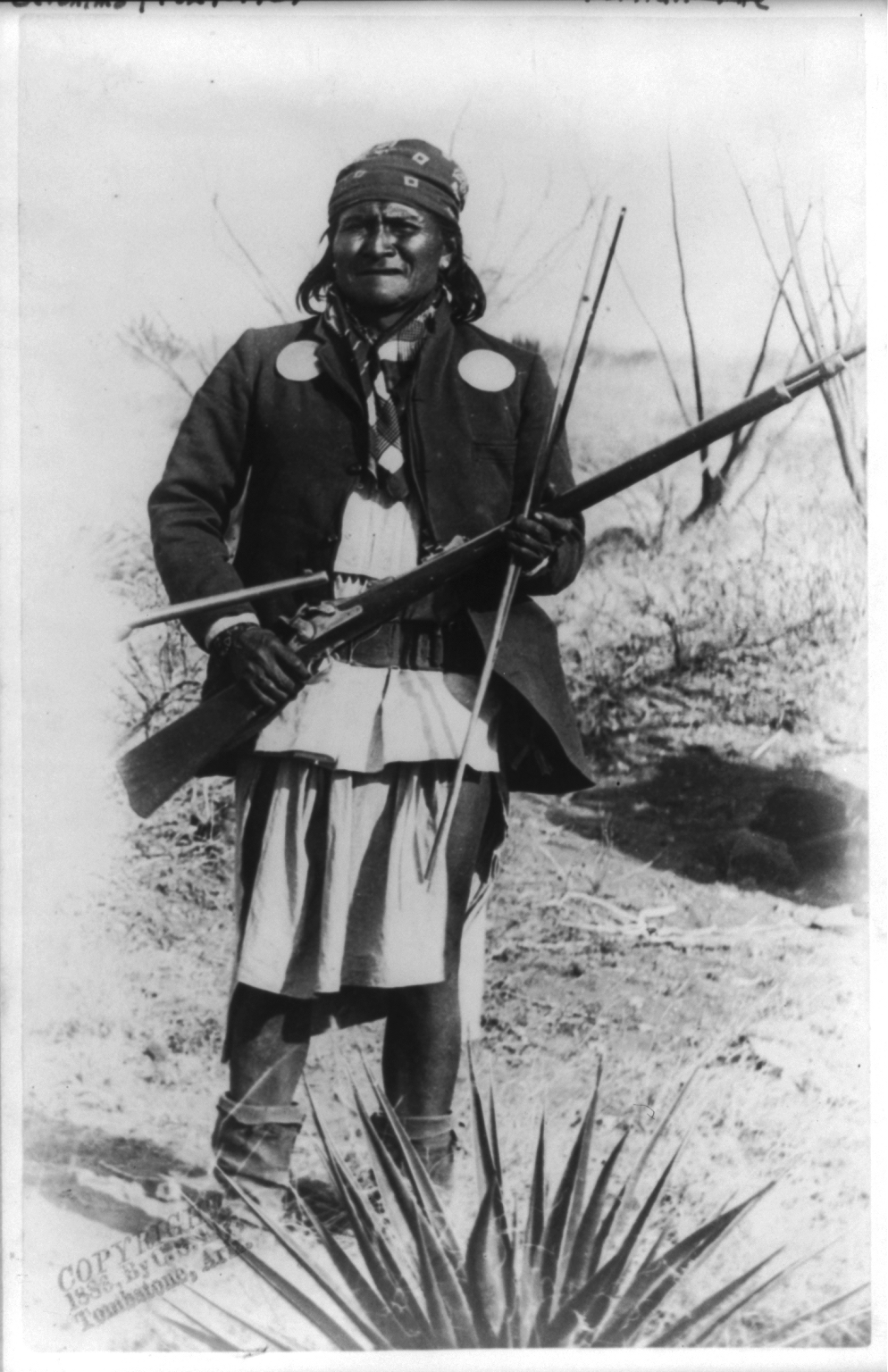
"Scene in Geronimo's camp...before surrender to General Crook, March 27, 1886: Geronimo, full-length portrait standing, facing left, rifle at port."

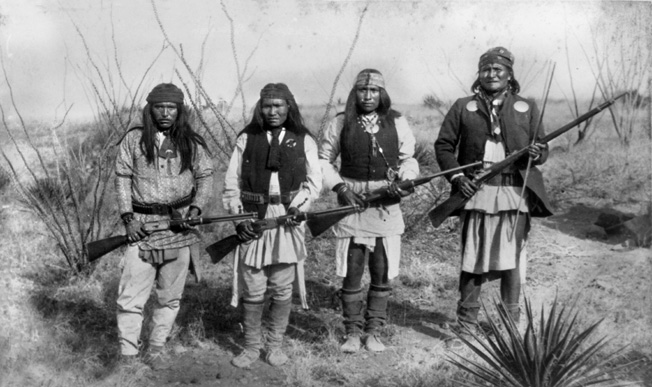
Geronimo, Yanozha (Geronimos's brother-in-law), Chappo (Geronimo's son by his second wife), and Fun (Yanozha's half brother) (right to left) in 1886.

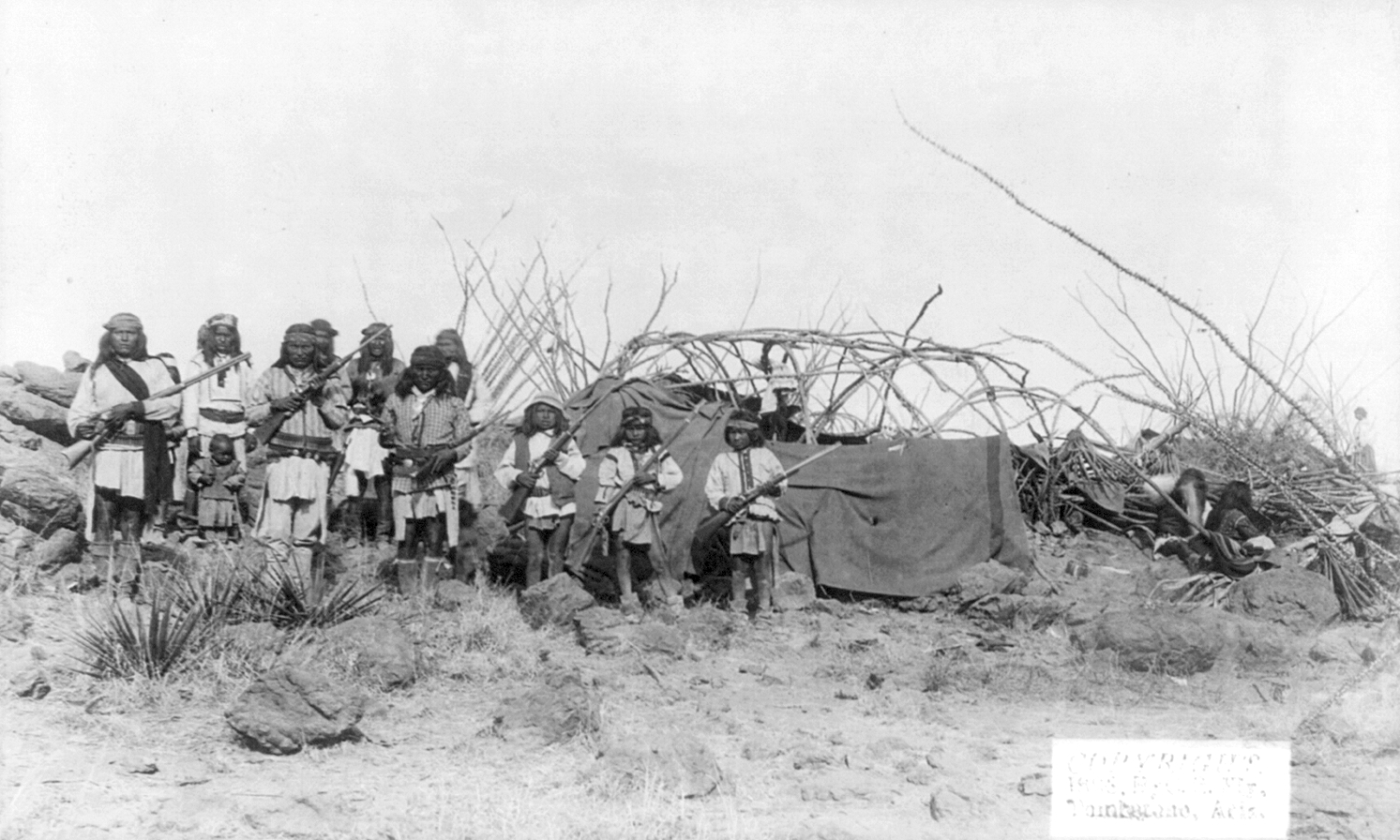
"Scene in Geronimo's camp before surrender to General Crook, March 27, 1886: group in Natches' camp; boys with rifles."

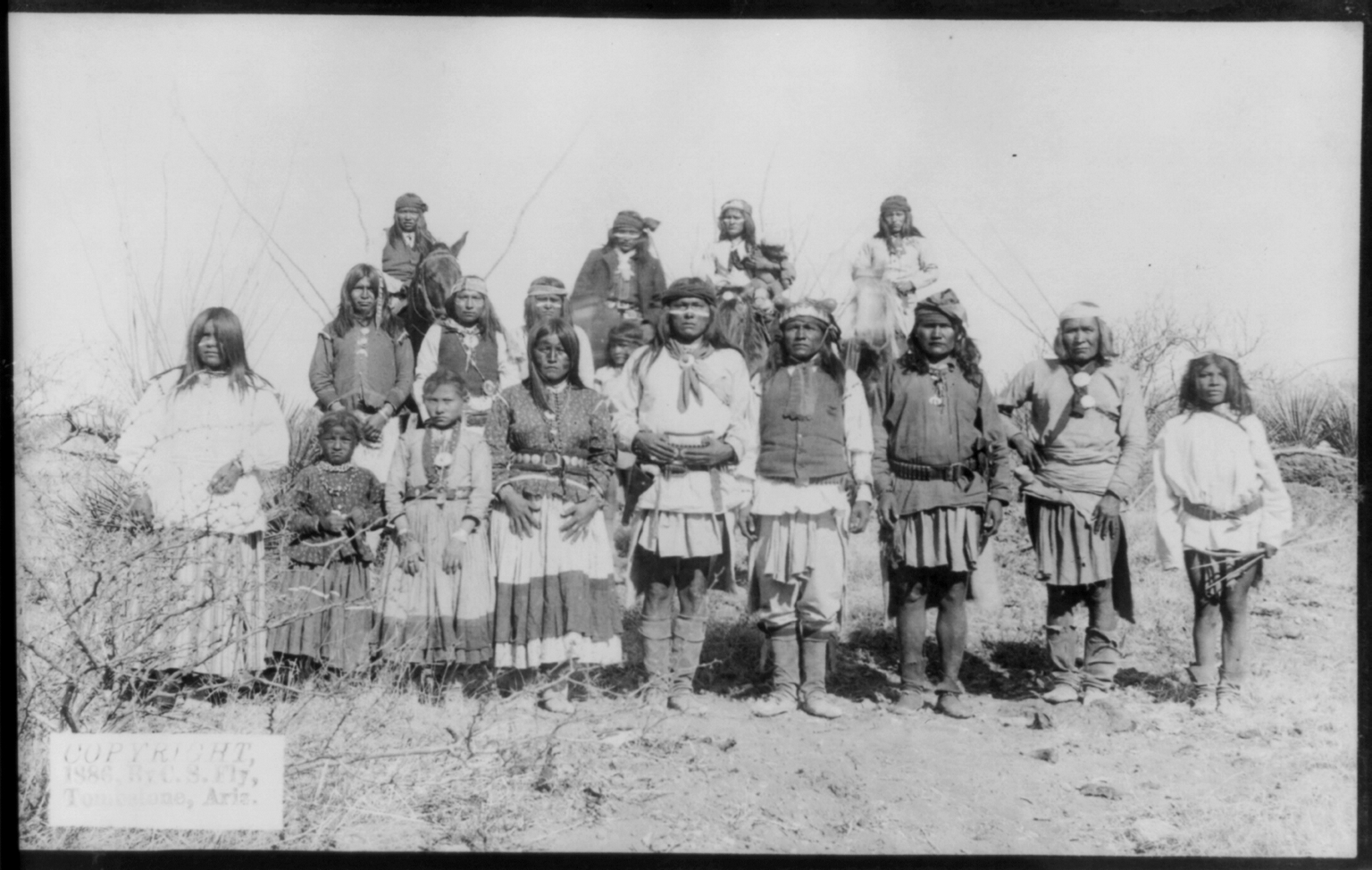
"Scene in Geronimo's camp...before surrender to General Crook, March 27, 1886: group of 18 men, women and children."

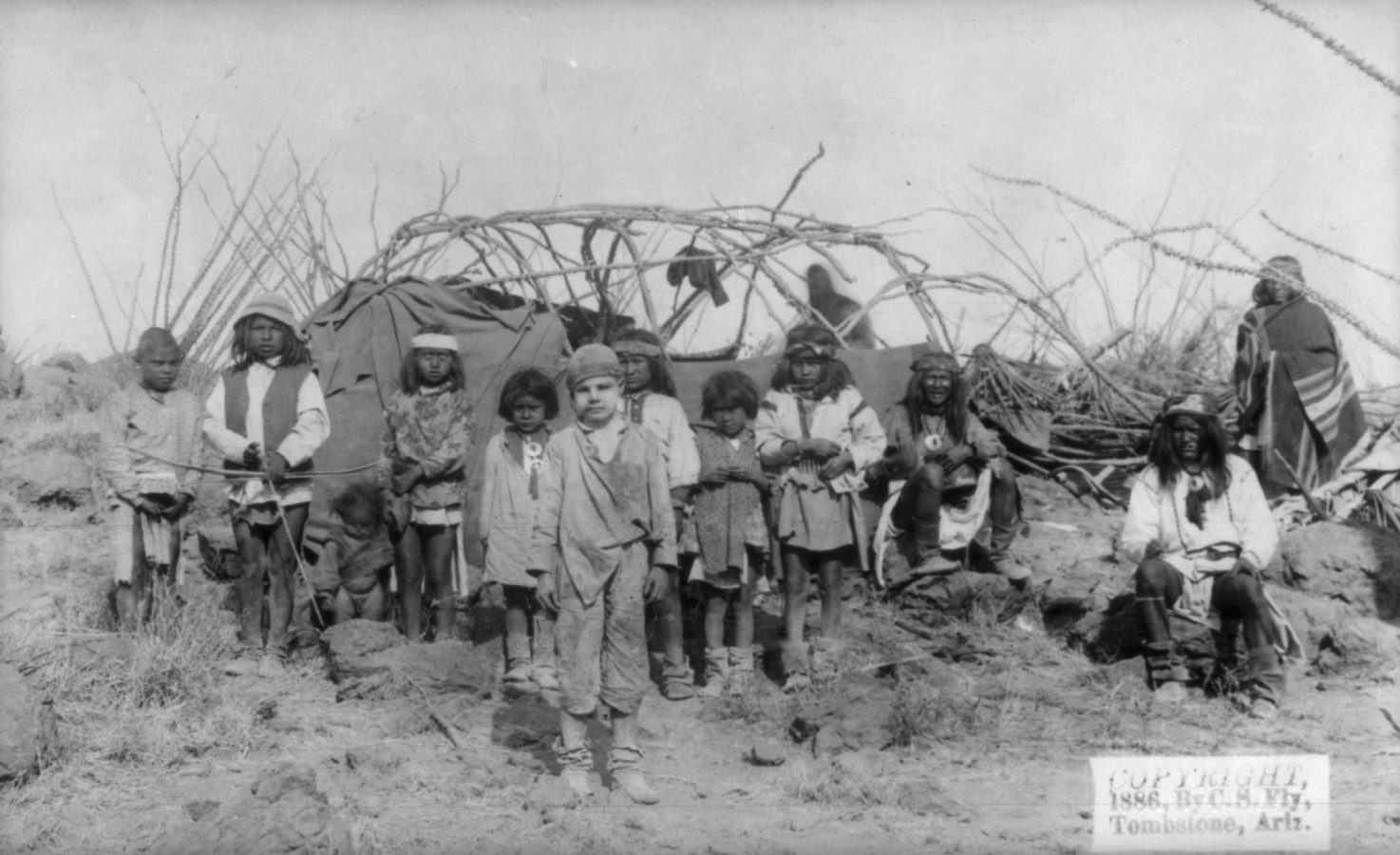
Eleven-year-old Jimmy McKinn was abducted in early September 1885 by Geronimo. Six months later he fiercely resisted being returned to his parents.

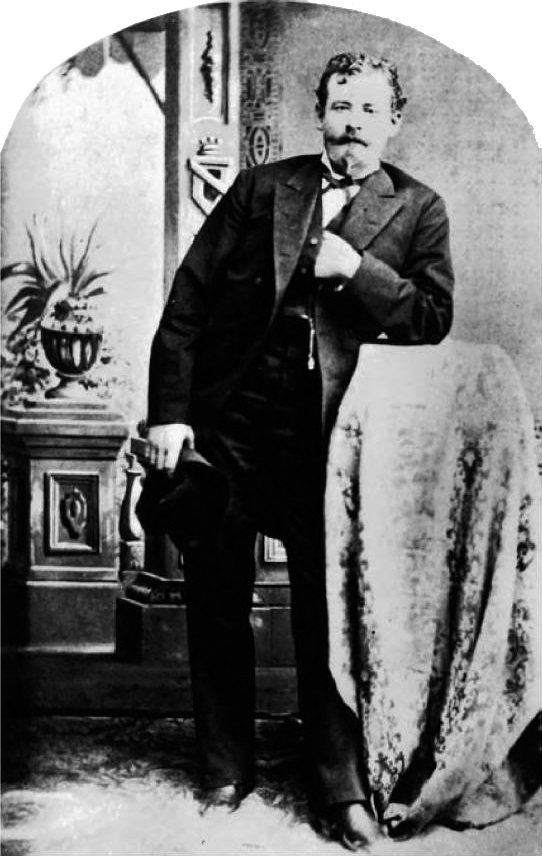
Ike Clanton in Tombstone about 1881.

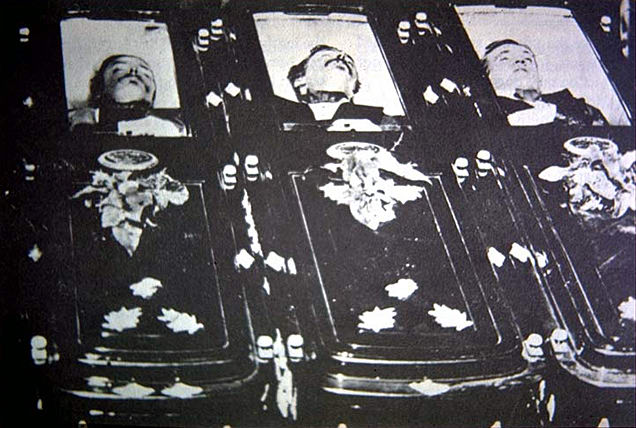
Tom McLaury, Frank McLaury, and Billy Clanton in their caskets (left to right) after the gunfight at the O.K. Corral. This is the only known photo of 18-year-old Billy.

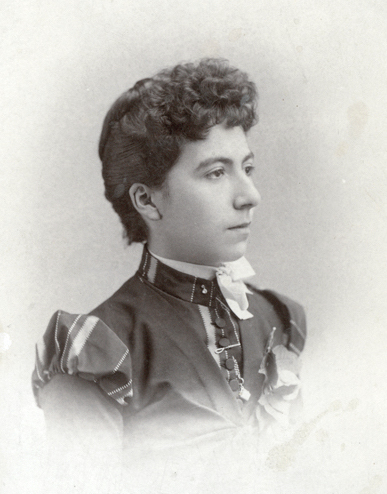
Disputed portrait of Sadie Marcus Behan (Josephine Earp), possibly Big Nose Kate, in Tombstone circa 1881.

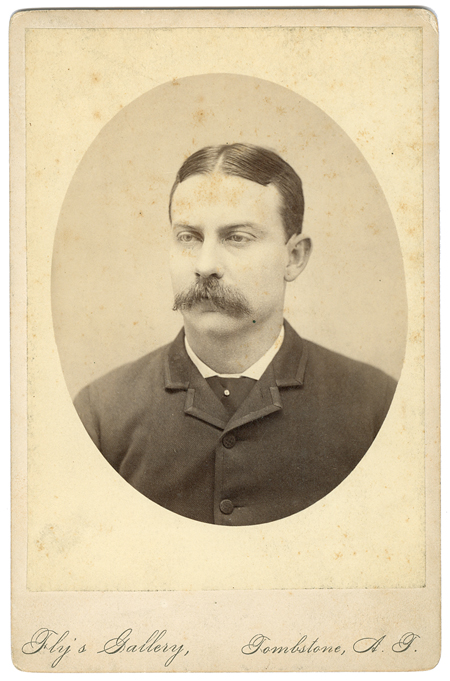
Dr. George E. Goodfellow, also known as the "Gunfighter's Surgeon"

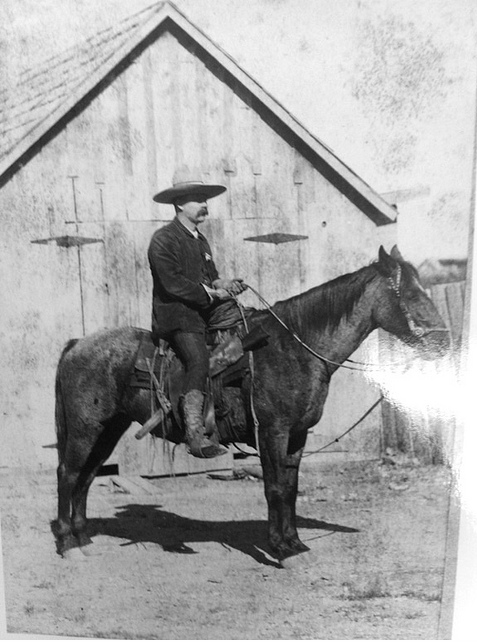
Dr. George E. Goodfellow on a horse given him by the Mexican governor

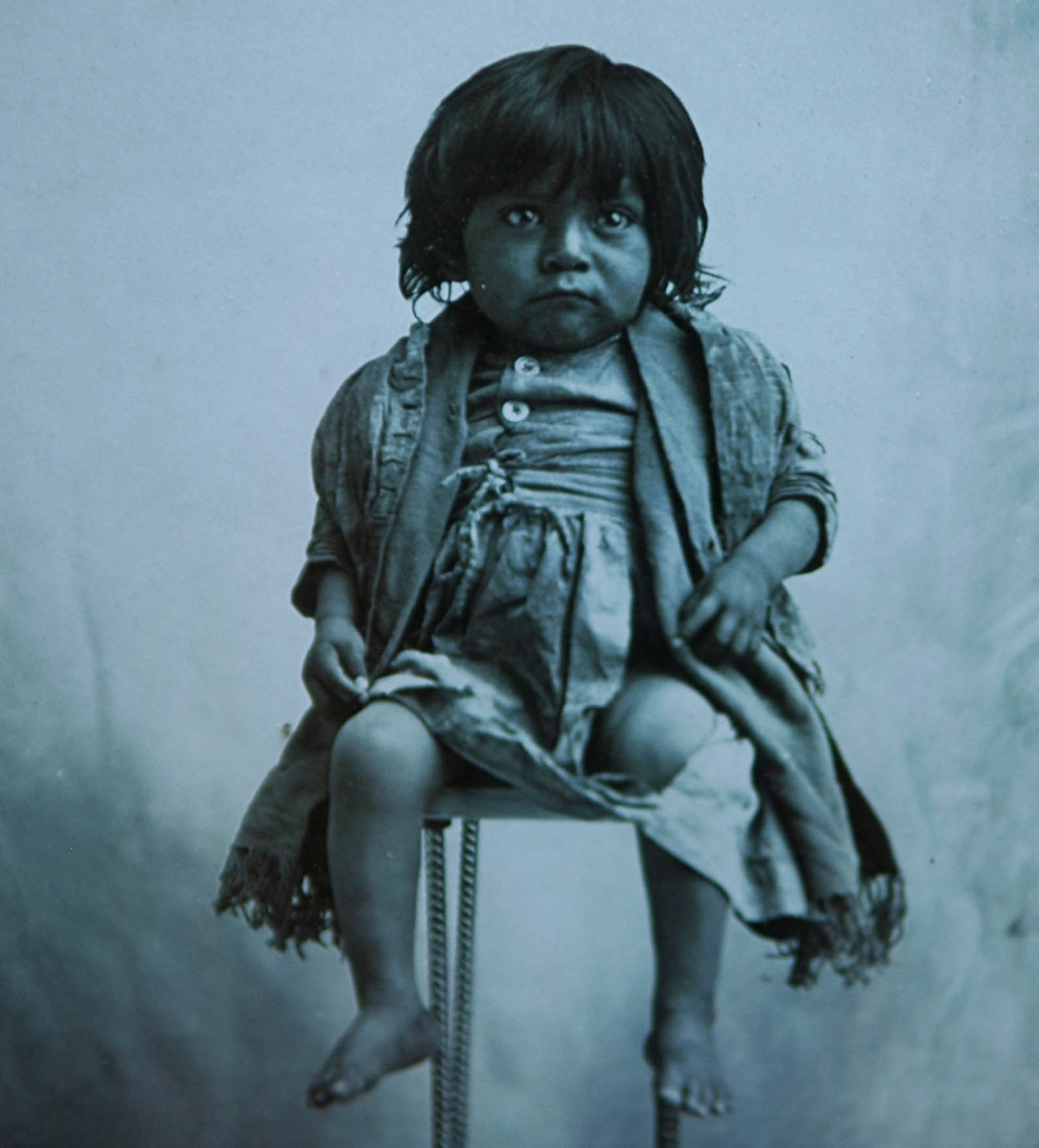
Apache May Slaughter (c. 1895–1900), orphaned by whites who killed her parents, was raised by the Slaughter family but died of burns from a fire.

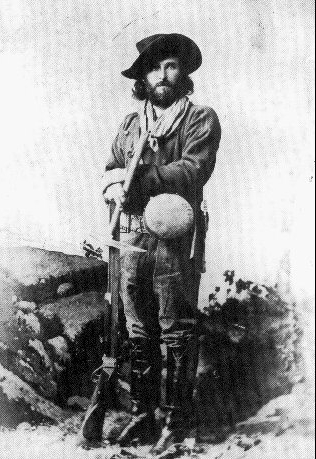
Ed Schieffelin found the first silver in the area. The town took its name from the name of his silver mine.

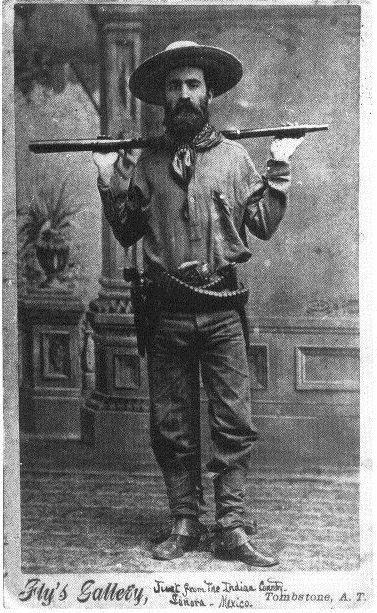
George Parsons on January 2, 1883, after returning from Sonora, Mexico.

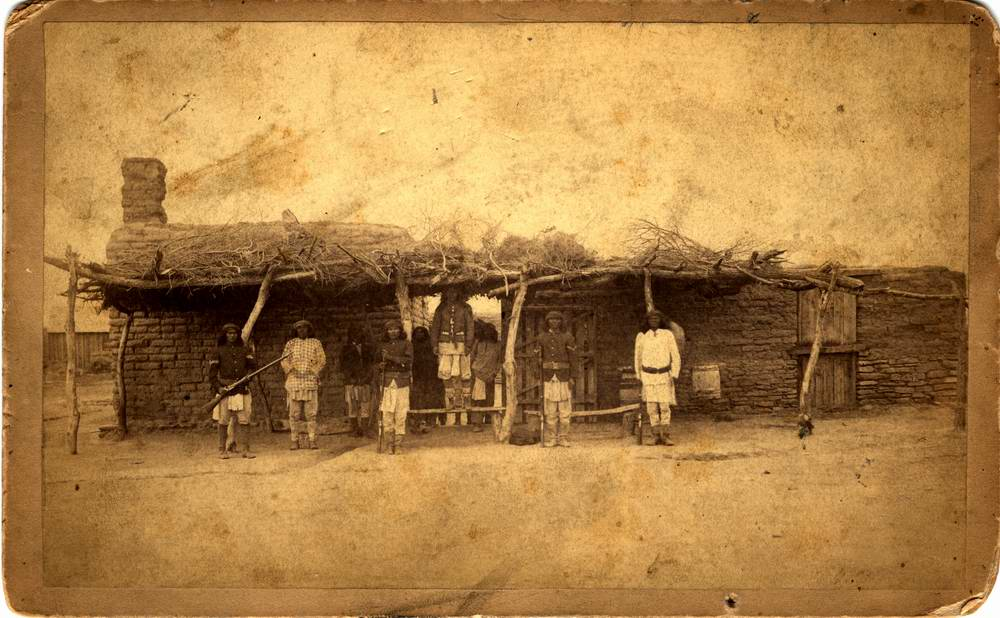
Indian Agency policemen in front of guard house in San Carlos, Arizona. They were appointed by the Reservation's Indian Agent.

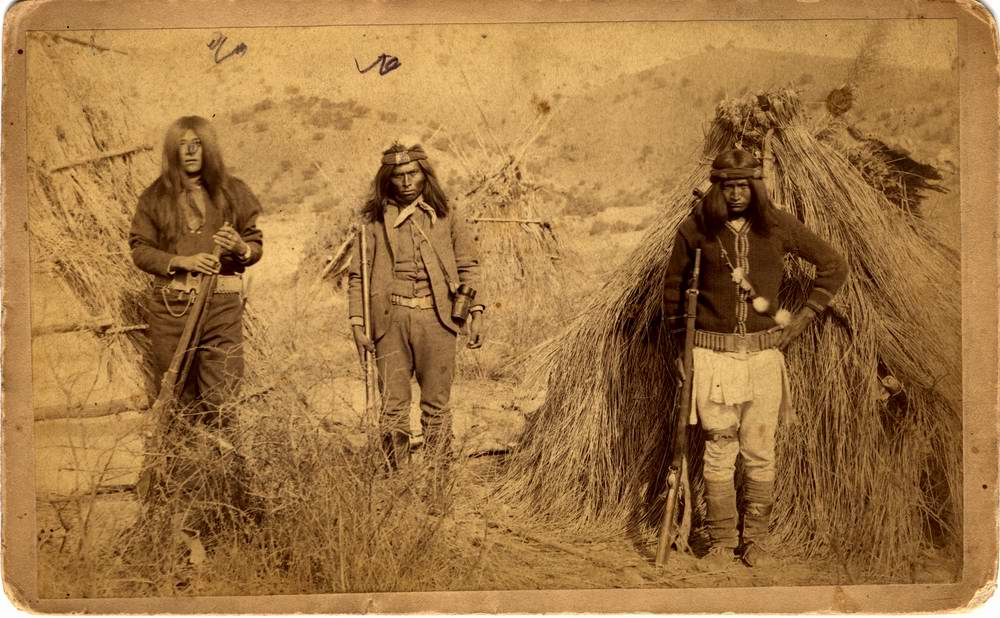
Chiricahua Apache warriors. Left to right: "Massai", "Apache Kid", and "Rowdy" pictured in a March 1886 photograph taken by C. S. Fly at Geronimo's camp.

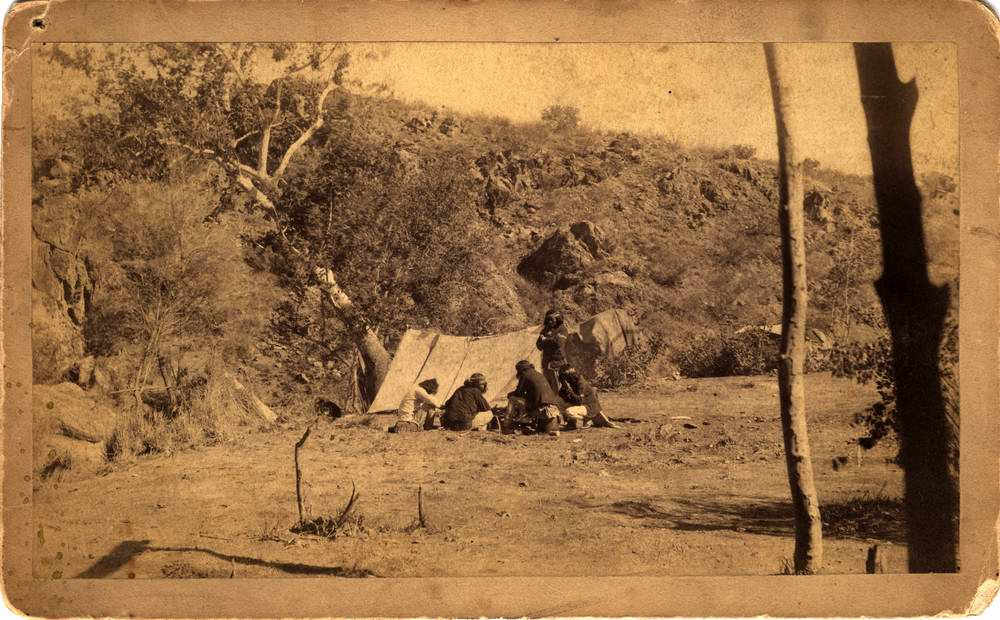
Apache encampment

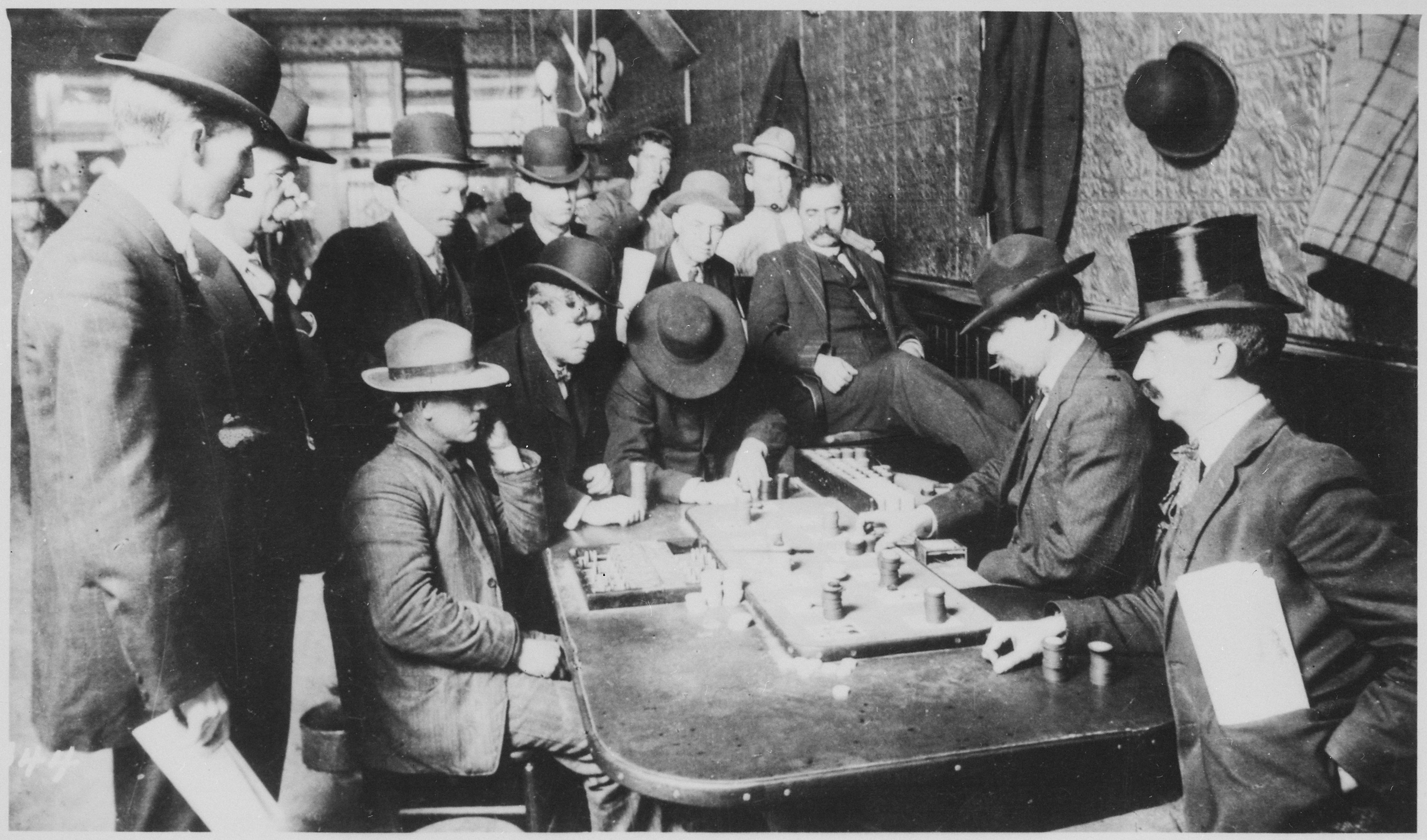
Faro game at the Orient Saloon in Bisbee, Arizona Territory c. 1900.

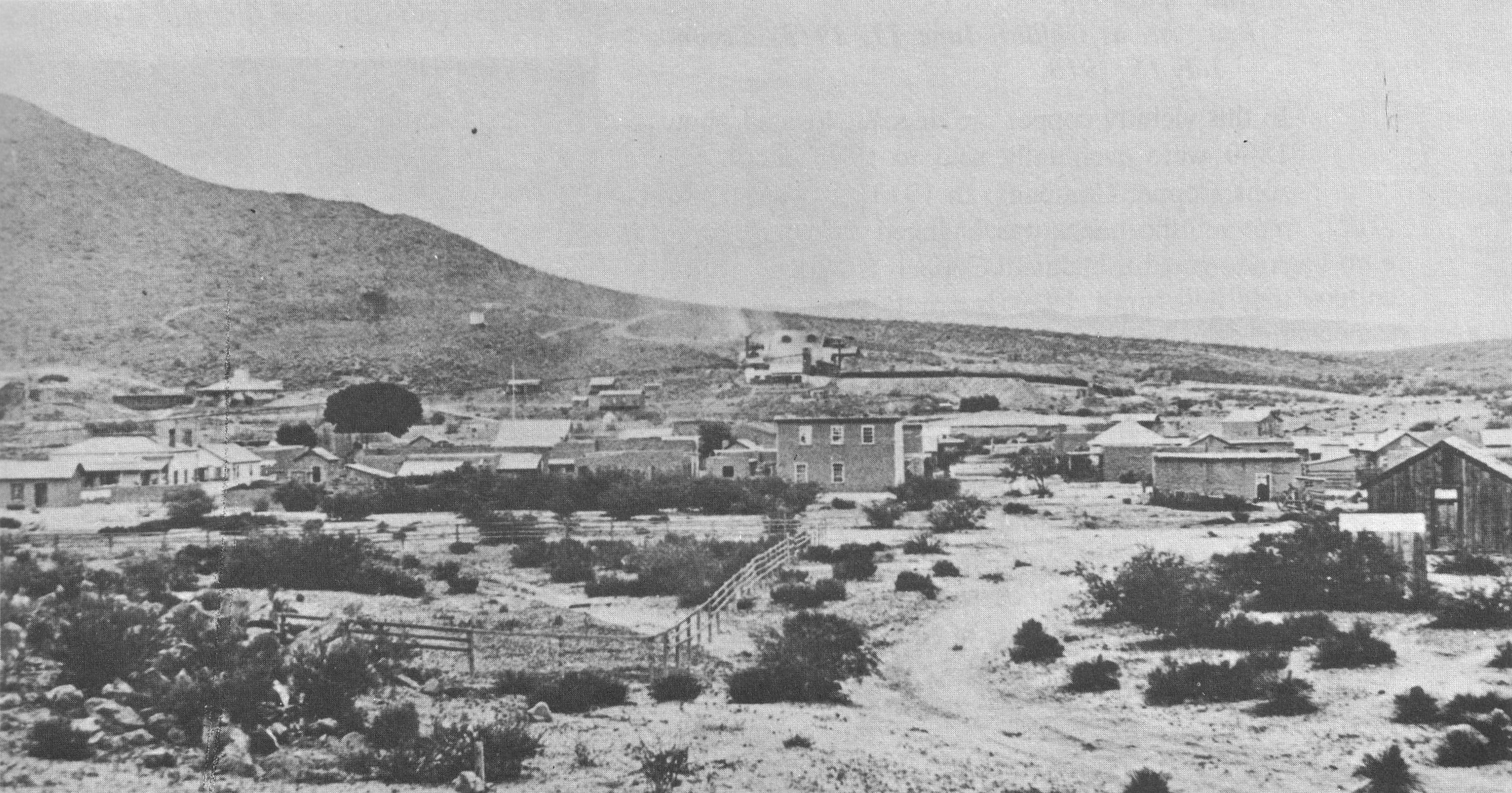
Charleston, Arizona Territory in 1885.

== Death ==
Fly ran a ranch in the Chiricahua Mountains for a period. Though Camillus and his wife had been separated for years, she was at his bedside when he died at Bisbee on October 12, 1901. She made arrangements to have his body returned to Tombstone, where it was buried in the new Tombstone Cemetery. Fly's Peak, the second highest named summit of the Chiricahua Mountains, is named in his honor.

== Mollie Fly continues business ==
Mary "Mollie" Fly continued to run the Tombstone gallery on her own after her husband's death and in 1905, she published a collection of her husband's Indian campaign photographs entitled Scenes in Geronimo's Camp: The Apache Outlaw and Murderer. Coral Henry, a young girl who the Flys cared for after her parents died, described Mollie as "about five feet of pure dignity, very plainly dressed, but in manner Queen Victoria had nothing on her."

In 1912, the boarding house burned to the ground for the second time. The fire prompted Mary to retire and she moved to Los Angeles. A replica was built some time later. Before she died in 1925, she donated her husband's collection of images to the Smithsonian Institution in Washington, D.C.

== In popular culture ==
His images are very collectible and command premium prices today. A cabinet card of the image "Geronimo, Son, and Two Braves" was auctioned by the Heritage Auction Galleries in Dallas, Texas for $10,157.50 in 2010. A 6-5/8" x 9-1/2" albumen print photograph of "Geronimo and his warriors", taken in 1886, sold at auction on April 14, 2014, for $1,375.

C.S. Fly appears in Elmore Leonard's western novel Gunsights (1979).

Police appointments
| Preceded by Scott White | Sheriff of Cochise County, Arizona; 1895–1897 | Succeeded by Scott White |
