= Mount Ballard =

Mount Ballard may refer to:

- Mount Ballard (Antarctica) a mountain in Ellsworth Land, Antarctica
- Mount Ballard (Arizona), a mountain in Cochise County, Arizona,
- Mount Ballard (Washington), a mountain located in eastern Whatcom County of Washington state
