= George Warren (prospector) =

American prospector (1835–1893)

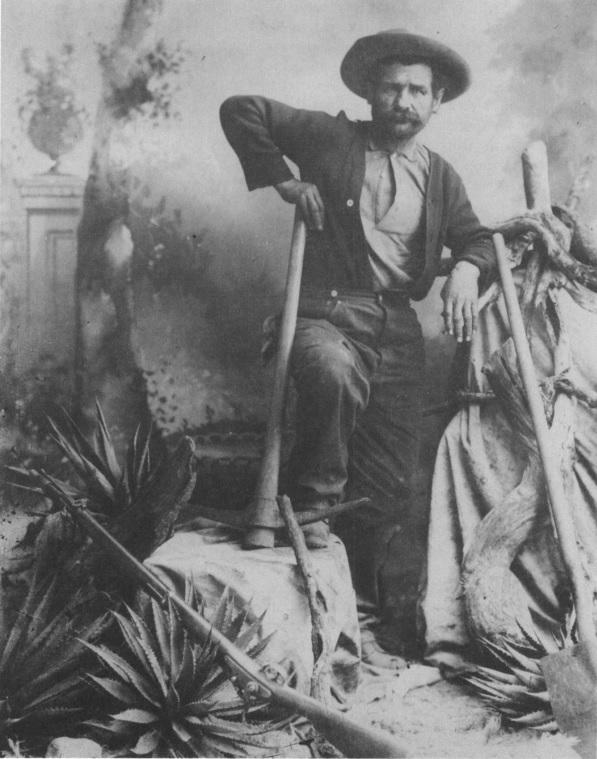
- Miner George Warren
- Born: 1835; Massachusetts
- Died: February 13, 1893 (aged 57–58); Bisbee, Arizona, United States
- Occupation: Miner
- Years active: 1877 – 1879
- Known for: Discovery of the Copper Queen Mine which he lost on a bet

George Warren (c. 1835–1893) worked as a prospector in the Tombstone and Bisbee, Arizona region during the late 19th century. He is credited with having located the body of copper ore, which later was known as the Copper Queen Mine, one of Arizona's most productive copper mines. Warren drank too much and bet his interest in the mine on a foot race against a horse and lost.

In 1880 pioneer photographer C. S. Fly often visited Bisbee on miners' paydays and he took a photo of Warren. The image was used as a model for the miner posing with long-handled spade on the Seal of Arizona. His pauper's grave, originally only marked by a wooden plank saying "G.W. 24" in the Bisbee-Lowell Evergreen Cemetery was later commemorated by a large monument erected in his honor.

== Biography ==
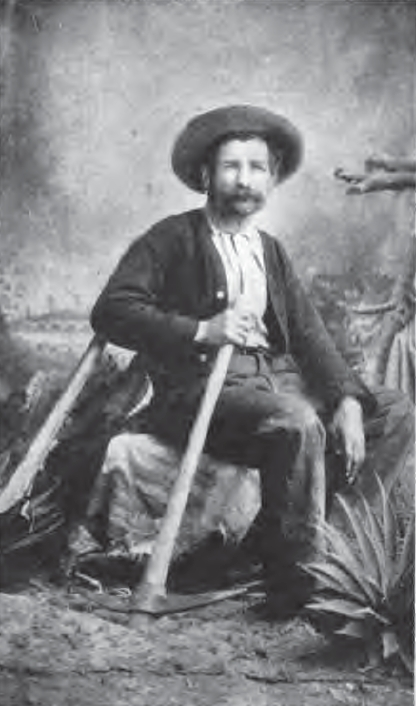
A second image of George Warren by C.S. Fly

George's mother died when he was very young and he lived with a maiden aunt until he was 10, when he was sent to New Mexico to join his father, who was a government teamster and later a herder. While herding horses, the Warrens were attacked by Apaches. George was wounded and his father was killed. George was held captive for 18 months until prospectors saw the white boy among the Indians and traded 15–20 pounds of sugar for Warren's freedom. Warren remained with these men for some time and learning about prospecting.

=== Ore discovery ===
The presence of copper ore in the Mule Mountains of southeast Arizona may have been known as early as 1876, but the first mining claim was filed on August 2, 1877. In 1877, a U.S. Cavalry patrol from Fort Bowie was tracking Apache Indians and camped at what was later called Iron Springs. The men didn't like the quality of the water and they sent Scout Jack Dunn to look for better quality water. During his search he found a spring along a very large cliff of limestone, later named Castle Rock, and on his return an outcrop containing lead carbonate, which was known to carry silver, in a gorge later known as Tombstone Canyon. Dunn told his commanding officer Lt. John Rucker and a packer named Ted Byrne of his discovery. They named the find the "Rucker" and planned to file a claim, but were delayed when their patrol was ordered to resume pursuit of a band of Apache warriors. Before departing Fort Bowie, they met a 42-year old George Warren and persuaded him to file a claim for them with the agreement that Warren would name Dunn in all notices of locations for mining claims that he located. They provided him with a grubstake, provisions, and a map to mining claim site.

Warren didn't keep his agreement with Dunn. On his way to the claims office, Warren stopped in a saloon, got drunk, and gambled away the grubstake given him by Dunn and the others. He went to Fort Huachuca and recruited additional backers from Tombstone. On September 27, 1877, 56 days after Dunn located the Rucker Mine, Warren filed a claim for the Mercy Mine 1 mile (1.6 km) up Mule Pass Canyon from Iron Spring. Over the next six months his name is mentioned either as the locator or witness in several other claims in the Tombstone Canyon and Mule Mountains and established what became known as the Warren Mining District. He held a one-ninth interest in the new Copper Queen mine.

=== Loses mining claim in a bet ===
George had a reputation as a drunk and got into fights. He was shot through the neck when fighting a duel and was shot in the arm and a leg on another occasion. The first wagon and team was dispatched into the mining region to bring a barrel of whisky to Warren.

While drinking with acquaintances in Charleston, the milling town for Tombstone, he argued with his friend George W. Atkins about the agility and speed of men versus horses. Warren claimed he could outrun a man on a horse over a distance of 100 yards (91 m). Atkins took the bet. If Atkins beat Warren, Atkins was to receive Warren's interest in the Copper Queen; if Warren beat Atkins, Warren was to receive Atkins's horse. A fair portion of the few hundred citizens of Charleston turned out on July 3, 1880 to watch the race. Warren placed a stake in the ground at 50 yards (46 m), believing he could beat the horse on the corner, but lost the bet and his one-ninth interest in the Copper Queen Mine, later estimated to be worth US$20,000 (equivalent to $558,000 in 2024).

Entrepreneurs Edward Reilly and Levi Zeckendorf bought an option to purchase the mine in 1880 for US$20,000. When the ore assayed at 22% copper, Reilly became enthusiastic about the mine's possibilities. He bought out others' interest in the claims in April, 1880, and went to San Francisco to see if he could market his option on the claims. Reilly persuaded engineers DeWitt Bisbee, William H. Martin, and John Ballard in San Francisco to visit the mine, and they were pleased with the prospects. On May 12, 1880, Martin and Ballard agreed to furnish the funds to mine and smelt the ore and received seven-tenths interest in the Copper Queen mine and two-thirds interest in the Copper King. Reilly retained the remainder.

James Douglas, who had invented new methods of smelting copper, learned of the Warren mining district early on. He was sent by the Phelps Dodge company of Pennsylvania to examine potential copper mines. During his research, Douglas concluded the risk was great but persuaded the company they should go forward. Offered the choice of a flat fee or a 10% interest in the property for his services, he chose the latter, a decision that subsequently made him a fortune. The company bought the Atlanta Mine and poured over $76,000 (equivalent to $2,502,000 in 2025) into exploration before they found the ore body. When the claims and ore bodies in the area would likely overlap, leading to potential costly litigation, they merged with their neighbor the Copper Queen mine, forming the Copper Queen Consolidated Mining Company in 1885.

Reilly raised $80,000 capital from Dewitt Bisbee to begin production. The surface pockets of cerussite were soon exhausted, but the owners found that the ore body ran 23% copper, with silver and gold as byproducts. Most mines of that era could profitably mine ore containing 3% or 4% copper, so the Copper Queen ore body was considered extraordinarily high grade. The surface oxide ore was exhausted after three or four years, but miners explored deeper and eventually found even larger ore bodies.

=== Declared insane ===
In May 1881, G.W. Atkins asked Cochise County Court Probate Judge J.H. Lucas to rule that Warren was insane, and George Praidham was appointed as Warren's guardian with the charge to sell his assets.

On June 1, 1881, Warren's interest in three mines—a one-twelfth interest in the Mammoth Mine, a one-third interest in the Safford Mine, and his one-third interest in the Crescent Mine—were sold at public auction for US$923. He was released soon after his property was sold. He was declared sane by the Cochise County Probate Court on 11/13/1883. He then went into Mexico where in 1885 he discovered a mining claim in Mexico and to gain legal title he became a Mexican citizen. He sold himself into peonage to pay off a debt of US$40. He worked as an interpreter for the district judge in Oposura, Mexico, for twenty-five pesos a day. When Judge G.H. Berry learned of his situation, he paid Warren's debt and Warren returned to Bisbee. The mining company provided him a small pension, and Warren worked as a blacksmith and tool dresser, but he finally resorted to the life of a "rounder" as the miners called it. He swept floors or cleaned the cuspidors in exchange for a drink of whisky.

=== Death ===
Sources for Warren's death date differ. The plaque on his cemetery monument at the Bisbee-Lowell Evergreen Cemetery lists the date of death as 1892. A Cochise County death certificate for a George Warren states he died of pneumonia and heart failure on February 13, 1893., and a newspaper blurb from the Tombstone Weekly Epitaph says February 12, 1893. An Arizona Republic article on September 15, 1897 stated Warren had died "three years ago." Penniless at the time of his death, Warren was buried in a pauper's grave and was practically forgotten for a number of years.

== Legacy ==
Arizona State Seal

Originally buried in a pauper's grave in Bisbee-Lowell Evergreen Cemetery under a small, wooden grave marker, the Bisbee Elk's Lodge launched a campaign in 1914 to erect a monument over his grave. When his grave was located, his body was moved to a more prominent location and a large monument was erected. A plaque on the monument depicts C.S. Fly's image of him and the words," George Warren Born unknown Died 1892 Poor in Purse Rich in Friends." C.S. Fly's photograph of Warren was the model for the miner incorporated into the Arizona State Seal, and the mining district around Bisbee was named for him. A suburb planned and built near Bisbee and Warren Ballpark in Bisbee were named after Warren.
