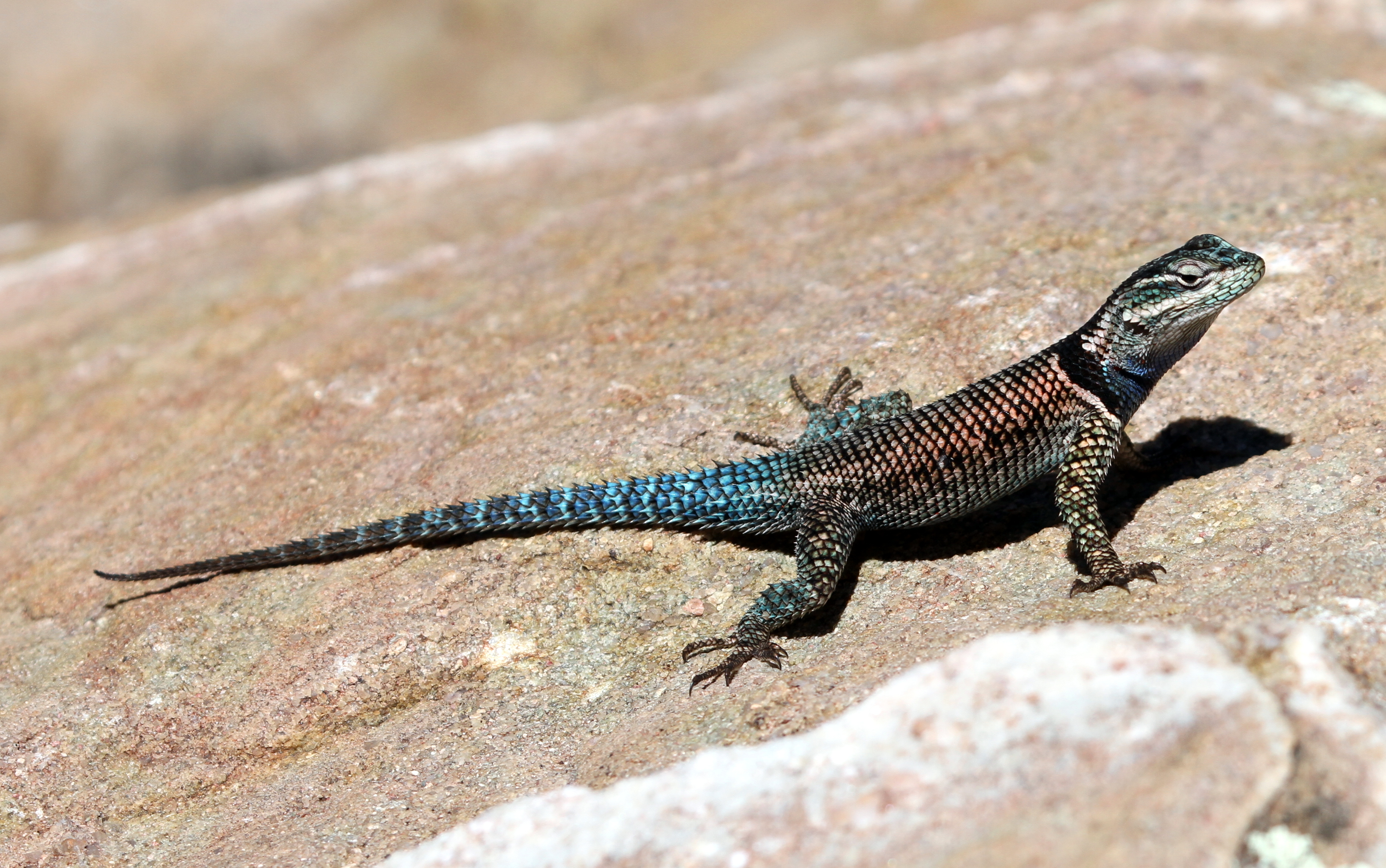
- Adult male in Tucson, AZ

Conservation status
- Least Concern (IUCN 3.1)

Scientific classification
- Kingdom: Animalia
- Phylum: Chordata
- Class: Reptilia
- Order: Squamata
- Suborder: Iguania
- Family: Phrynosomatidae
- Genus: Sceloporus
- Species: S. jarrovii

Binomial name
- Sceloporus jarrovii Cope, 1875
- Geographic range of Sceloporus jarrovii shown in red

Synonyms
- Sceloporus jarrovii Cope, 1875; Sceloporus yarrovii [sic] — Boulenger, 1885; Sceloporus ornatus — Boulenger, 1897 (fide H.M. Smith et al., 2000); Sceloporus lineolateralis H.M. Smith, 1936; Sceloporus jarrovii — H.M. Smith, 1938

= Sceloporus jarrovii =

Yarrow's spiny lizard

Species of lizard

Sceloporus jarrovii, also known commonly as Yarrow's spiny lizard, is a species of lizard in the family Phrynosomatidae. The species is native to the southwestern United States and northern Mexico. There are two recognized subspecies.

== Etymology ==
The specific name, jarrovii, is in honor of Henry Crécy Yarrow (November 19, 1840 – July 2, 1929), an American ornithologist, herpetologist, naturalist, and surgeon.

== Geographic range ==
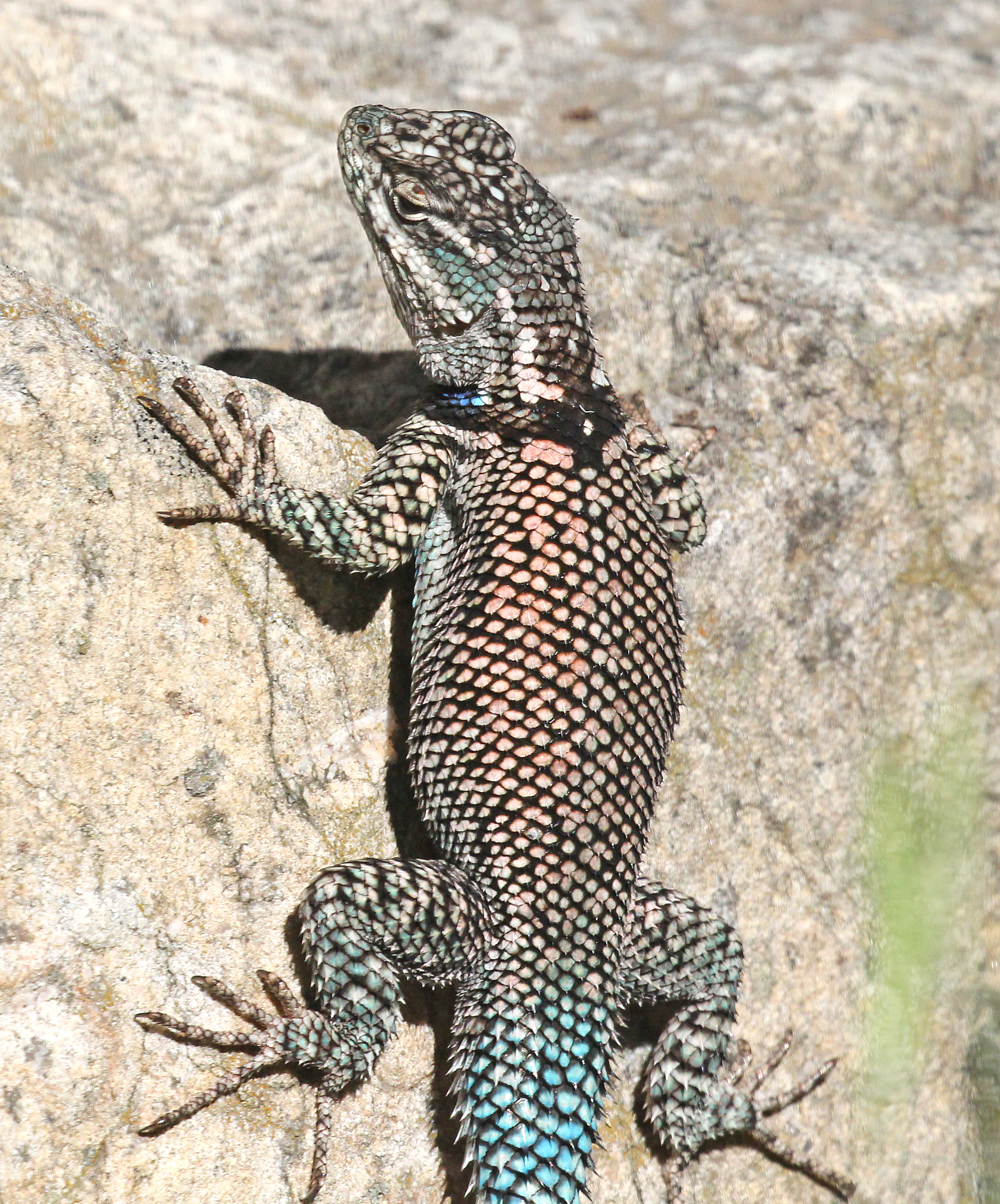
The nominate subspecies in Ramsey Canyon, Arizona

S. j. jarrovii is found in the United States in the states of Arizona and New Mexico, and it is found in Mexico in the states of Chihuahua, Durango, Sonora, northern Tamaulipas, and western Zacatecas. The subspecies S. j. lineolateralis is found only in Mexico in the states of Durango and Zacatecas.

== Habitat ==
The preferred natural habitats of S. jarrovii are forest and rocky areas. Its habitat in the Mule Mountains of Arizona is shrinking as a result of climate change, which may lead to its designation and protection under the Endangered Species Act of 1973, pending the result of litigation.

== Description ==
S. jarrovii grows to a snout-to-vent length of 10.5 cm (4.1 in) with keeled scales and a crosshatch-patterned torso. Its coloration includes tints of pink, green, blue, and copper. The top of the head is dark gray. Males have a blue throat and a blue belly. A complete black collar with a white inferior border distinguishes this lizard from similar species.

== Reproduction ==
S. jarrovii is viviparous.

== Subspecies ==
Two subspecies of S. jarrovii are recognized as being valid, including the nominotypical subspecies.

- Sceloporus jarrovii jarrovii Cope, 1875
- Sceloporus jarrovii lineolateralis H.M. Smith, 1936 – lined spiny lizard
