= Lavender Pit =

Former copper mine in Cochise County, Arizona

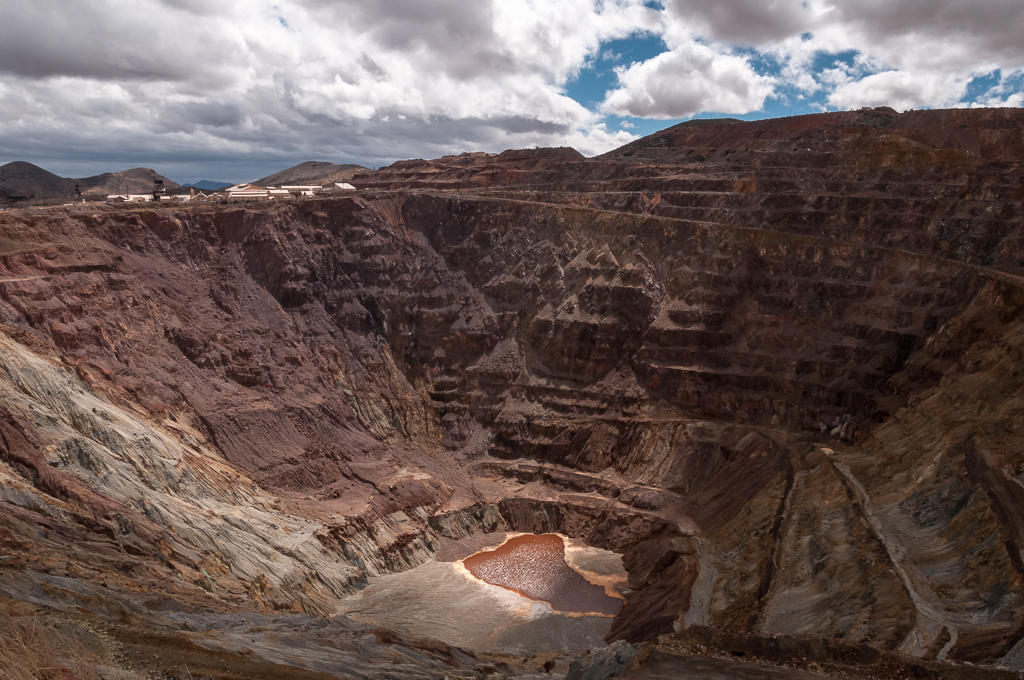
Lavender Pit

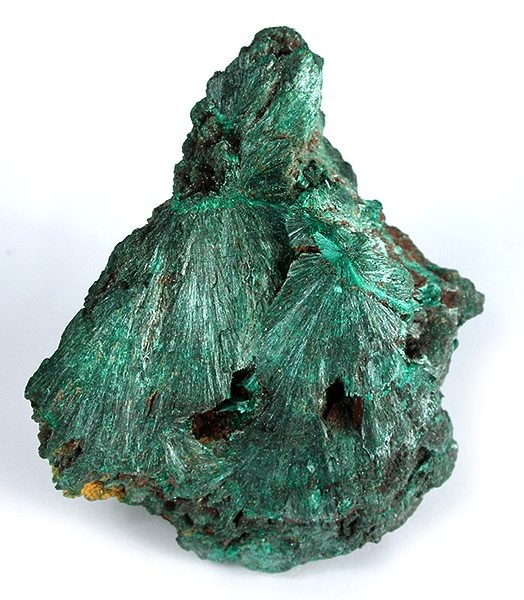
A specimen of Brochantite from the Lavender Pit

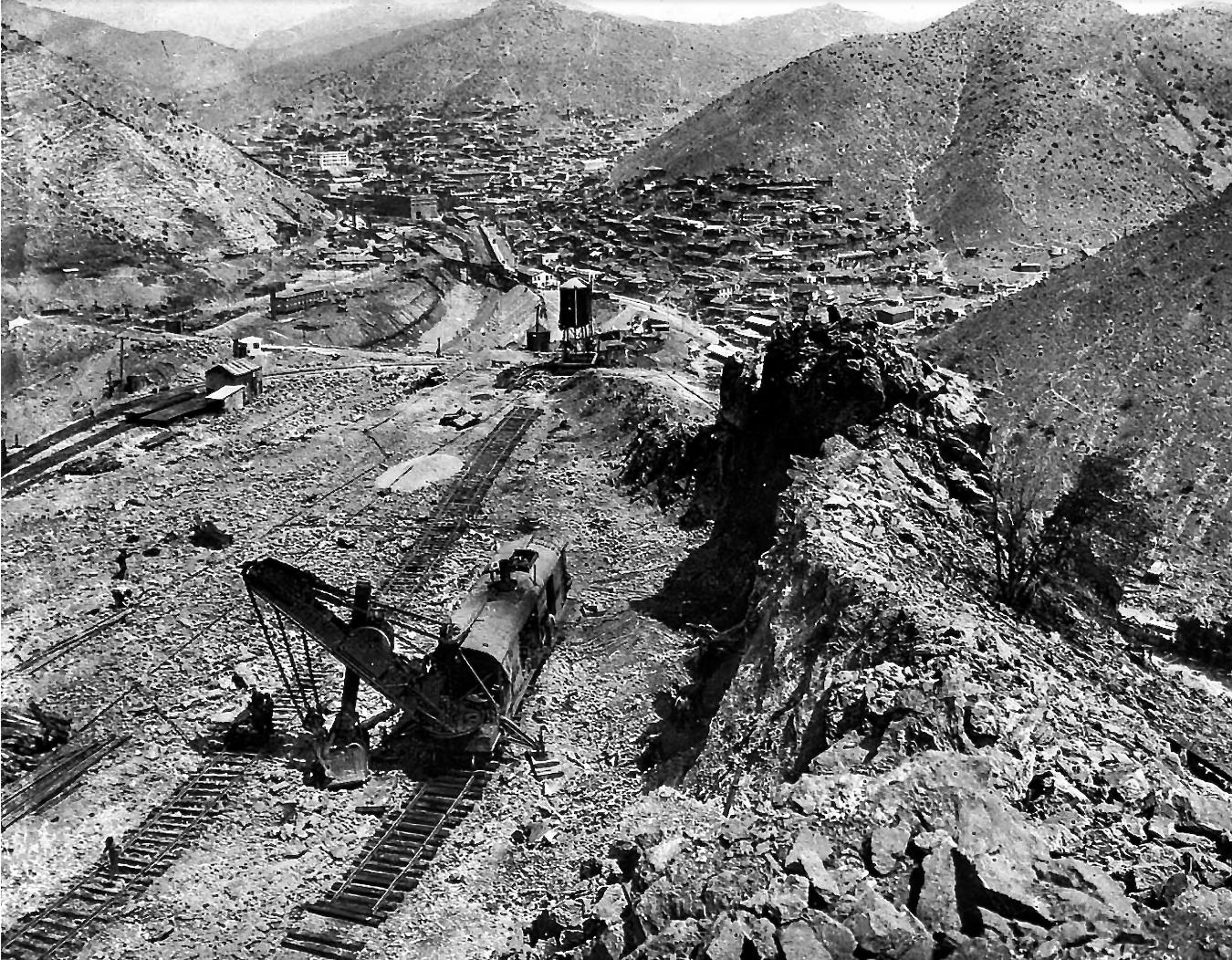
A Bucyrus steam shovel starts the open pit at Bisbee, Arizona, 1918. This became the Lavender Pit

The Lavender Pit is a former open pit copper mine near Bisbee in Cochise County, Arizona, United States. It is located near the famous Copper Queen Mine. The Lavender Pit was named in honor of Harrison M. Lavender (1890–1952), who as vice-president and General Manager of Phelps Dodge Corporation, conceived and carried out this plan for making the previously unprofitable low-grade copper bearing rock of the area into commercial copper ore.

Phelps Dodge Corporation opened the Lavender Pit in 1950, at the site of the earlier, higher-grade Sacramento Hill mine. Production through 1974 totaled 86 million tons of ore averaging about 0.7% copper, or about 600,000 tons of copper produced, with gold and silver as byproducts. About 256 million tons of waste were stripped, but a portion of this was acid-leached for additional copper. Turquoise was also a by-product of this mining activity. Bisbee turquoise, also known as Bisbee Blue, is amongst the finest turquoise found anywhere in the world. Mining operations in the pit ended in 1974. The undeveloped Cochise deposit, located immediately north of the Lavender pit, contains an estimated 190 million tons of rock containing 0.4% acid-soluble copper, which may be mined in the future.

Because of the competent host rock, this pit has much steeper sides than other open pit copper mines in the southwest area. The pit covers an area of 300 acres (1.2 km^{2}), and is 900 feet (274 m) deep. Large tonnages of dump rock are placed around Bisbee, notably north of the residential district of Warren and other parts of the southeastern Mule Mountains area.

== Geography ==
The mine is at 31°25′55″N 109°53′57″W, at an altitude of 4941 feet (1506 m) above mean sea level.

== See also ==
- Copper mining in Arizona
