= Mollie Fly =

American photographer (1847–1925)

Mary Edith "Mollie" Fly
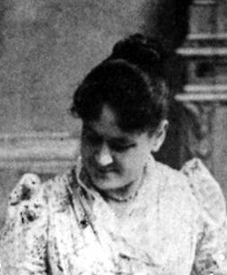
- Born: Mary Edith McKie c. 1847
- Died: 1925
- Occupations: Photographer, boarding house owner
- Years active: 1879–1912
- Spouse(s): Samuel D. Goodrich (before 1879); Camillus "Buck" Sydney Fly (1879–1901)
- Children: Kitty Fly (adopted)

Mary Edith Fly (c. 1847–1925) was a late 19th and early 20th century American photographer who co-founded and managed Fly's Photography Gallery in Tombstone, Arizona, with her husband, photographer C.S. "Buck" Fly. She ran the studio alone after his death in 1901. There were few women photographers in this period, and her contributions were recognized in 1989 when she was inducted into the Arizona Women's Hall of Fame.

== Personal life ==
Mary Edith McKie, known as Mollie, was born in about 1847. In the late 1850s, her family moved to San Francisco. Little else is known about her early life, and nothing is known about how she got her photographic training.

She was married twice, first to Samuel D. Goodrich whom she divorced after two years. In 1879, in San Fransicso, she married photographer Camillus Sidney "Buck" Fly. The couple later adopted a daughter, Kitty Fly.

== Photographic career ==
The Flys moved to the boomtown of Tombstone in Arizona Territory in 1879 and set up a photographic studio. Initially it was housed in a tent, but by mid-1880 they had built a 12-room boarding house on Fremont Street – their "Fly's Photography Gallery" was in the back of the premises. In 1881, the Gunfight at the O.K. Corral took place in a lot next to the boarding house, and Ike Clanton escaped through the boarding house during the gunfight.

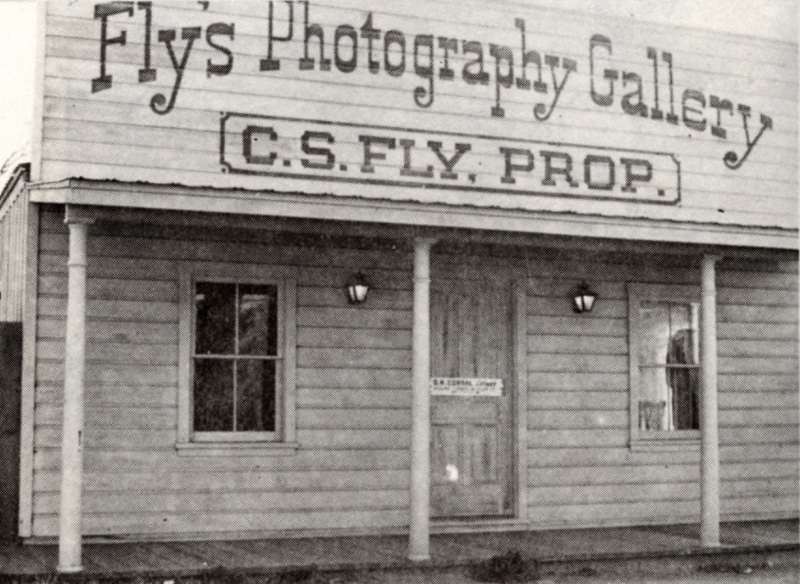
Fly's Photography Gallery (before 1901). A modern reconstruction exists today in Tombstone.

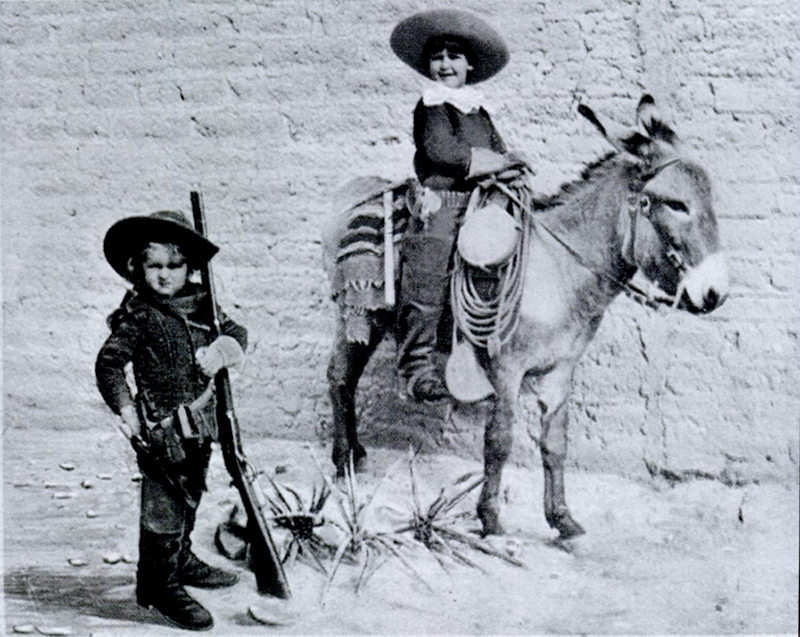
Photographic postcard by Mollie Fly, captioned "Arizona Prospectors, Tombstone", n.d. (before 1912). A rare example of her work.

Buck was often gone on photographic expeditions, and during his absence Mollie ran both the boarding house and Fly's Photography Gallery, taking studio portraits for 35 cents apiece. It is not known how many photographs she took because almost all the known images from Fly's Photography Gallery are credited to her husband. There are a couple of extant postcards of street scenes credited to her.

Buck Fly became a heavy drinker, and Mollie separated from him for a time in 1887. By the late 1880s, Tombstone was suffering from a declining economy, so the Flys moved to Phoenix in 1893. There they opened a new photography studio. This business failed and they returned to Tombstone a year later.

The Flys separated again in the late 1890s, at which time Buck opened a studio in the copper-mining town of Bisbee, Arizona. Here the Flys suffered the first of two fires that would destroy a large portion of their collection of glass-plate negatives; in this case, the negatives lost were in storage at the Phelps Dodge Mercantile Company warehouse.

While Buck was in Bisbee, Mollie Fry ran the Tombstone studio on her own, continuing to do so for another decade after Buck's death in Bisbee in 1901. In 1905, she published a collection of Buck's photographs entitled Scenes in Geronimo’s Camp: The Apache Outlaw and Murderer.

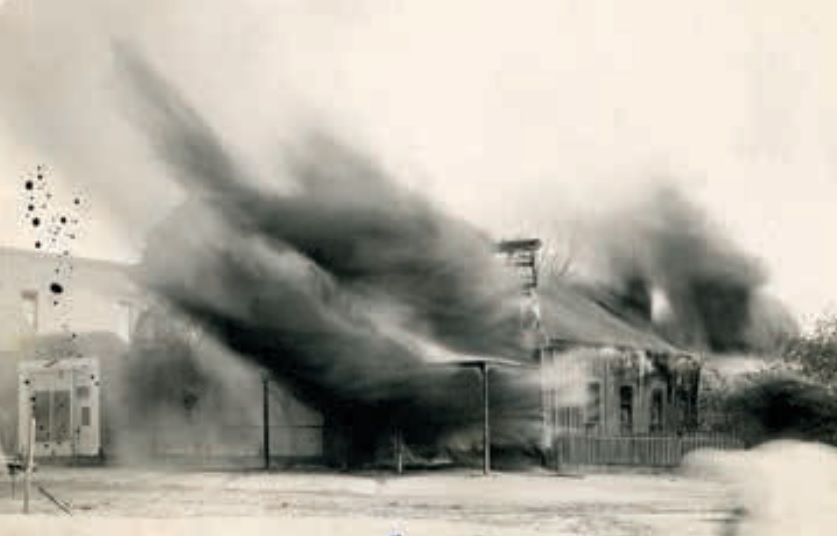
The Fly photography studio burning in July 1912. Photograph by Mollie Fly.

Mollie Fly retired in 1912, but three years later a fire destroyed her studio. She then moved to Los Angeles, where she died in 1925. Many of the Flys' negatives had been destroyed in the two fires, but Fly donated her remaining collection of photographic negatives to the Smithsonian Institution in Washington, D.C.

== In popular culture ==
- Fly is a character in Romain Wilhelmsen's 1999 novel Buckskin and Satin.
- Fly is a character in Margaret Mater's 2009 novel What Might Have Been.
- Mollie Fly is a character the Wild West Chronicles Season 2, Episode 9, titled "Last Shot at the OK Corral". Fly is portrayed by Hanna Balicki.
