= Bisbee Blue =

Turquoise from copper mines near Bisbee, Arizona

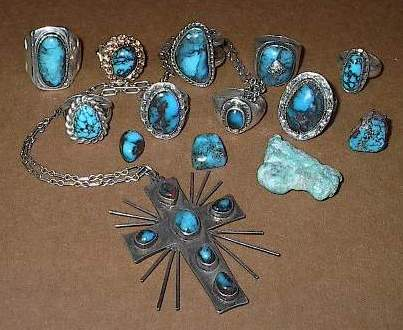
Bisbee turquoise commonly has a hard chocolate brown colored matrix.

Bisbee Blue or Bisbee turquoise refers to the turquoise that comes from copper mines located in the vicinity of Bisbee, Arizona. Bisbee turquoise can be found in many different shades of color and quality, from soft, low quality pale blue, to the quality hard brilliant blue turquoise and almost every shade of blue in between. The highest grade of Bisbee Blue turquoise is almost lapis lazuli blue and has a brownish-red spiderweb matrix. Green turquoise is also found in Bisbee.

== History ==
=== Discovery ===
Though small amounts of turquoise were found in the Campbell shaft mine, as well as in stream beds in the Mule Mountains, the vast majority of Bisbee turquoise surfaced when the Phelps Dodge Corporation started open pit mining operations at the location now known as the Lavender Pit, especially the eastern side of the pit. Large amounts of a conglomerate rock bed needed to be removed before the copper ore located more deeply could be reached. This sedimentary conglomerate "waste" rock was the host for most of the turquoise, in both vein and nugget form.

=== Recovery ===
During the time that the largest quantities of turquoise were being extracted from the mine, the company made no organized effort to recover it. It simply got loaded into large dump trucks and hauled off to the "dumps". During this time (primarily from the late 1950s to the late 1960s), some of the recovered turquoise was obtained by company employees taking it home in their lunch boxes, etc. Though this activity was prohibited, the prohibition was rarely enforced. For several years (mostly the early to late 1970s), these individuals, locally known as "dumpers", were the only source for this fine turquoise aside from those who were granted exclusive access to collect turquoise existing in the mine dumps during a set day annually for a marginal fee.

During this time, Phelps Dodge leased out the dumps to Bob Matthews. Matthews and associates were the only legal miners of the Bisbee turquoise and other copper minerals in history besides the annual dig pass holders. Matthews sold large lots to the famous artists the Zacharys from Albuquerque, New Mexico, the owners of the Turquoise Museum in Albuquerque, John Hartman in Durango, Colorado, and many other famous artists and traders. Some of Matthews' turquoise was sent to Durango to be made into jewelry by his brother-in-law Cecil Mickelson's jewelry company. The company made Bisbee Blue and Villa Grove inlay turquoise jewelry up until the 1980s. In the early 2000s the Durango Silver Company, bought what was thought to be left of the Bob Matthews/Cecil Mickelson Collection of Bisbee turquoise. This collection amounted to approximately 500 lb (230 kg) of rough Bisbee turquoise. Still, numerous reputable artists and suppliers continue to sell what remains of the exquisite and highly collectible turquoise from Bisbee.
