= Mount Ballard (Arizona) =

Landform in Cochise County, Arizona

- Location within Arizona Location within the United States

Highest point
- Elevation: 7,374 ft (2,248 m) NAVD 88
- Prominence: 210 ft (64 m)
- Coordinates: 31°26′37″N 109°57′33″W

Geography
- Location: Cochise County, Arizona, U.S.
- Parent range: Mule Mountains
- Topo map: USGS Bisbee

Climbing
- Easiest route: Hike

Mount Ballard, with an elevation of 7,374 feet (2,248 m) is located in Cochise County, Arizona, about 1.8 miles (3 km) west of Bisbee.

== See also ==
- List of mountains and hills of Arizona by height
