= Copper Queen Mine =

Copper mine in Cochise County, Arizona, US

Coordinates: 31°26′26″N 109°54′53″W

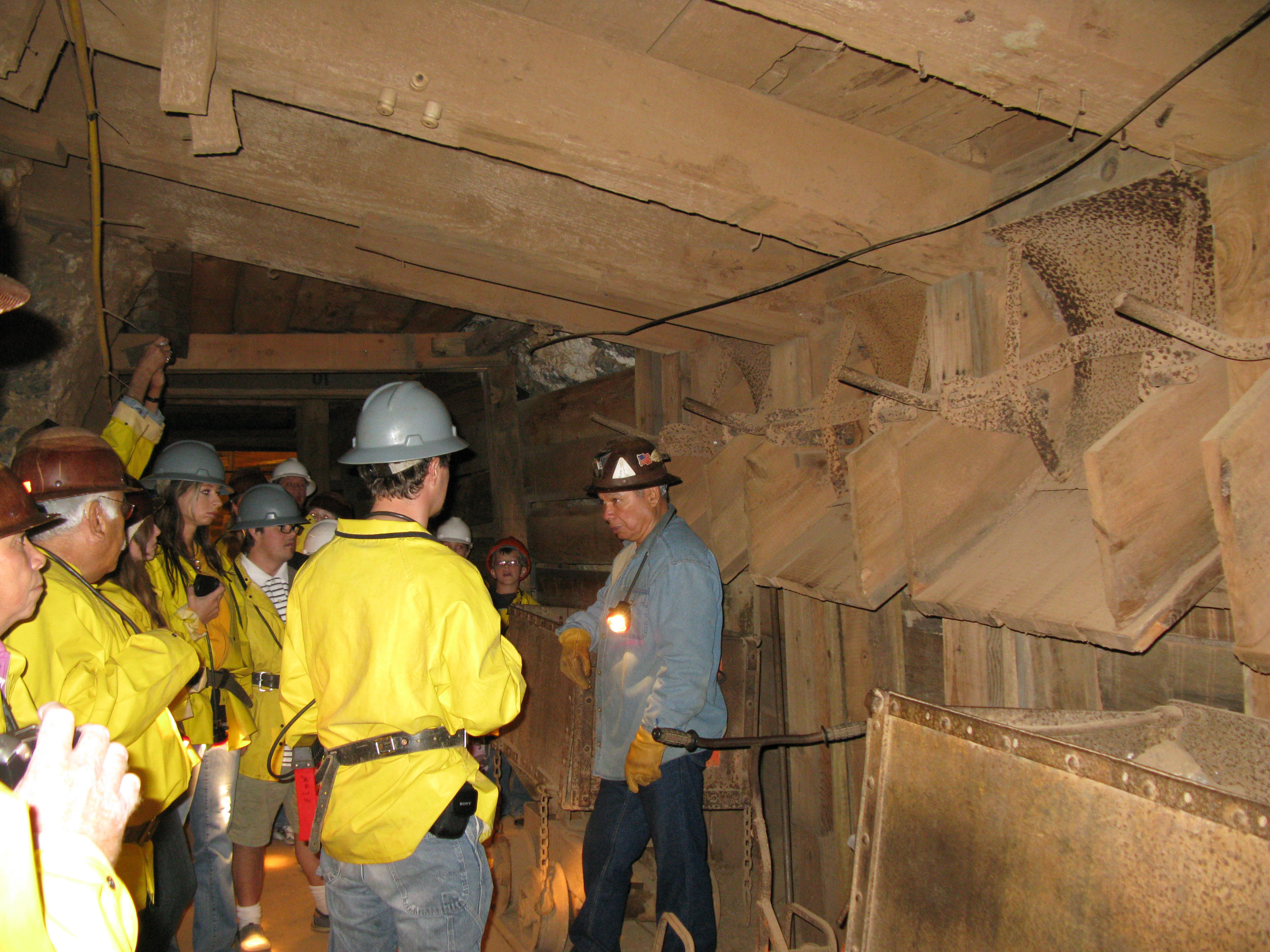
Copper Queen Mine Tour, Sept 2008

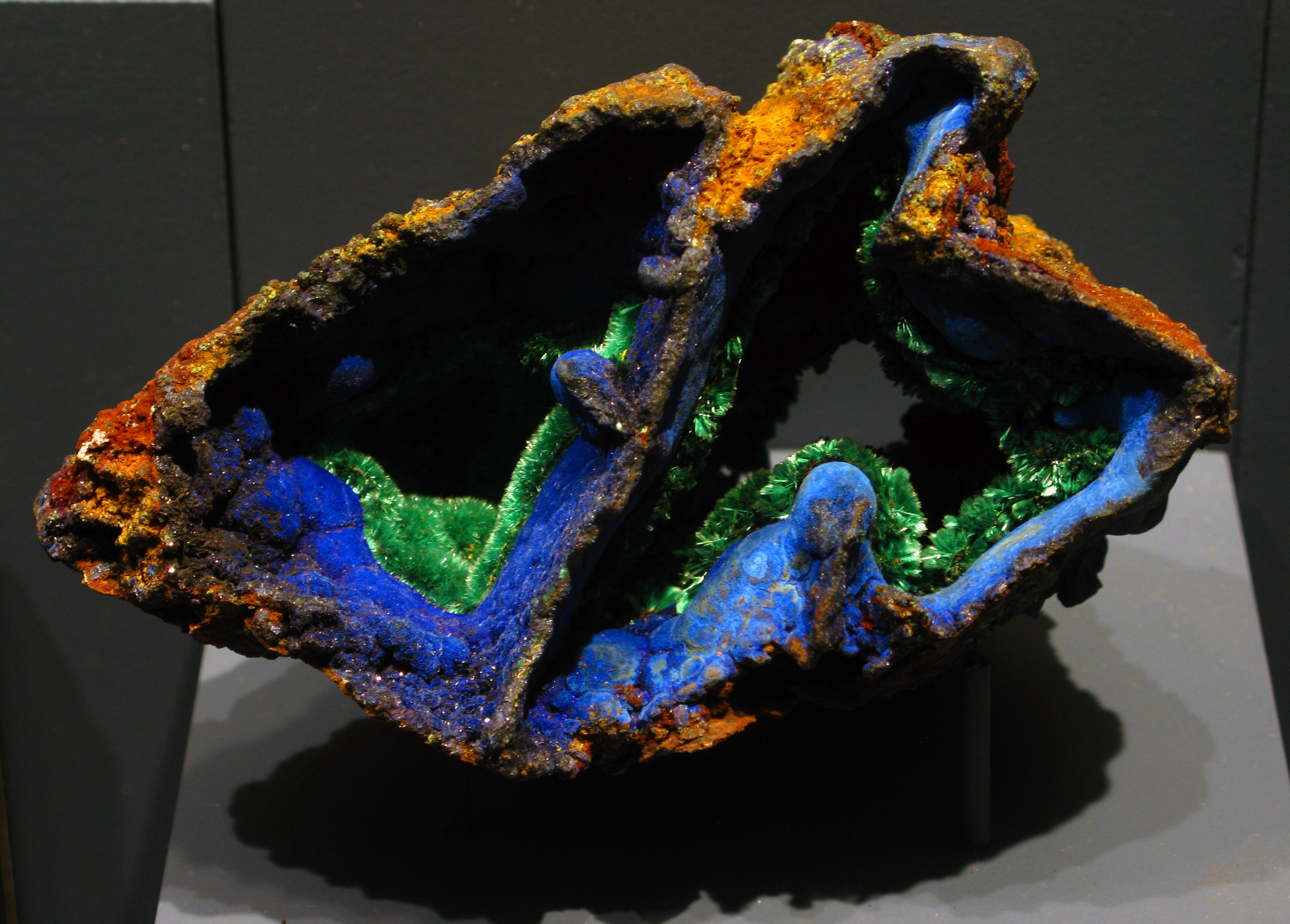
Classic Bisbee Azurite and Malachite specimen from the Copper Queen mine. This specimen was in the personal collection of Dr. James Douglas, and was later donated to the Smithsonian by his son.

The Copper Queen Mine was a copper mine in Cochise County, Arizona, United States. Its development led to the growth of the surrounding town of Bisbee in the 1880s. Its orebody ran 23% copper, an extraordinarily high grade. It was acquired by Phelps Dodge in 1885.

In the early 1900s, this was the most productive copper mine in Arizona. While copper mining declined in the area in the 1930s and 1940s, the Copper Queen continued to be mined by the open-pit process during the years following World War II. With decreasing returns, Phelps Dodge closed it in 1985.

== History ==
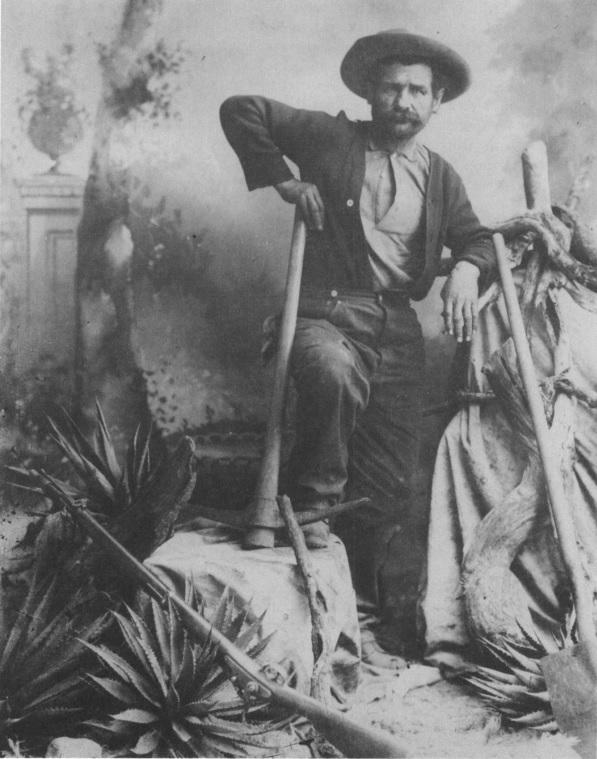
C. S. Fly's image of miner George Warren first appeared in Souvenir of Bisbee published in 1900. Fly's caption was, "Discoverer of the Copper Queen Mine."

The presence of copper ore in the Mule Mountains of southeast Arizona may have been known as early as 1876, but the first mining claim was filed on August 2, 1877. In 1877, a U.S. Cavalry patrol from Fort Bowie was tracking Apache Indians and camped at what was later called Iron Springs. The men didn't like the quality of the water and they sent Scout Jack Dunn to look for better quality water. During his search he found a spring along a very large cliff of limestone, later known as Castle Rock, and on his return an outcrop containing lead carbonate, which was known to carry silver, in a gorge later known as Tombstone Canyon. Dunn told his commanding officer Lt. John Rucker and a packer named Ted Byrne of his discovery. They named the find the "Rucker" and planned to file a claim, but were delayed when their patrol was ordered to resume pursuit of a band of Apache warriors. Before departing Fort Bowie, they met a 42-year old George Warren and persuaded him to file a claim for them with the agreement that Warren would name Dunn in all notices of locations for mining claims that he located. They provided him with a grubstake, provisions, and a map to mining claim site.

Warren didn't keep his agreement with Dunn. On his way to the claims office, Warren stopped in a saloon, got drunk, and gambled away the grubstake given him by Dunn and the others. He went to Fort Huachuca and recruited additional backers from Tombstone. On September 27, 1877, 56 days after Dunn located the Rucker Mine, Warren filed a claim for the Mercy Mine 1 mile (1.6 km) up Mule Pass Canyon from Iron Spring. Over the next six months his name is mentioned either as the locator or witness in several other claims in the Tombstone Canyon and Mule Mountains and established what became known as the Warren Mining District. He held a one-ninth interest in the new Copper Queen mine.

While drinking with acquaintances in Charleston, Warren made a friendly, drunken bet that he could outrun a man on a horse, but lost the bet and his one-ninth interest in the Copper Queen Mine, later estimated to be worth US$20,000 (equivalent to $558,000 in 2024).

Entrepreneurs Edward Reilly and Levi Zeckendorf bought an option to purchase the mine in 1880 for US$20,000. When the ore assayed at 22% copper, Reilly became enthusiastic about the mine's possibilities. He bought out others' interest in the claims in April, 1880, and went to San Francisco to see if he could market his option on the claims. Reilly persuaded engineers DeWitt Bisbee, William H. Martin, and John Ballard in San Francisco to visit the mine, and they were pleased with the prospects. On May 12, 1880, Martin and Ballard agreed to furnish the funds to mine and smelt the ore and received seven-tenths interest in the Copper Queen mine and two-thirds interest in the Copper King. Reilly retained the remainder.

James Douglas, of Phoenixville, Pennsylvania who had invented new methods of smelting copper, learned of the Warren mining district early on. He was sent by the Phelps Dodge company of New York City to examine potential copper mines. During his research, Douglas concluded the risk was great but persuaded the company they should go forward. Offered the choice of a flat fee or a 10% interest in the property for his services, he chose the latter, a decision that subsequently made him a fortune. The company bought the Atlanta Mine and poured over $76,000 (equivalent to $2,119,000 in 2024) into exploration before they found the ore body. When the claims and ore bodies in the area would likely overlap, leading to potential costly litigation, they merged with their neighbor the Copper Queen mine, forming the Copper Queen Consolidated Mining Company in 1885.

The surface pockets of cerussite were soon exhausted, but the owners found that the orebody ran 23% copper, with silver and gold as byproducts. Most mines of that era could profitably mine ore containing 8% to 10% copper, so the Copper Queen orebody was considered extraordinarily high grade. The surface oxide ore was exhausted after three or four years, but miners explored deeper and eventually found even larger orebodies.

In 1884–85 the mine was offered for sale to London investors for £350,000, but the offer was not taken up. In the early 20th century, the Copper Queen ranked as the most productive copper mine in Arizona and was viewed by many as the best run copper mine in the United States. Deposits of gold and silver were also discovered in the mine.

The mining work was extremely hazardous. The Phelps Dodge mine operators routinely demanded unpaid work, subjected miners to intrusive physical strip searches, and followed dangerous practices like blasting while miners were in the mine and not permitting safety operators on drills and elevators. There were also widespread claims of discrimination against non-white miners. A miners union organized in 1917, when the mine was the site of an Industrial Workers of the World miners' strike. Phelps Dodge resisted union organizing and illegally used private police to arrest more than 1300 miners. They put them on railroad cars and expelled them from the town and area in what became known as the Bisbee Deportation.

Before engines were used to transport cars of ores, mules were trained to pull ore cars out of the mines. The loaded cars weighed up to 2,800 pounds (1,300 kg). The mules lived in the mines 24/7, sleeping in stables in the mines. The mules would spend four years working in the mines, after which time their eyesight deteriorated. In order to adjust them to daylight, blinders were placed over the mules' eyes with small holes poked in the material. The holes were slowly widened as the mule's eyes adjusted to the light.

In the 1950s, Phelps Dodge developed open-pit mining at the Copper Queen; this enabled mining operations to continue. Underground work was also done. By the mid-1960s, the grade of ore from the Copper Queen had declined to 4%. The mine ceased production in 1975.

As proposed by the mayor and volunteers seeking an alternative economic base, the company agreed to allow part of the mine to be open for tours. This area was renovated by paid and volunteer workers to create a heritage tourism site. More than one million visitors have seen the mine since it reopened in 1976. Phelps Dodge's former headquarters building in Bisbee has been adapted as a mining museum, which offers interpretation of the mining era and its effects in the region.

The company was acquired by Freeport McMoRan, which in the early 21st century was investigating new means of mining in this area.

== See also ==
- Bisbee Massacre
- Copper mining in Arizona
- Courtland, Arizona
- Lavender Pit
