= Mule Mountains =

Landform in Arizona

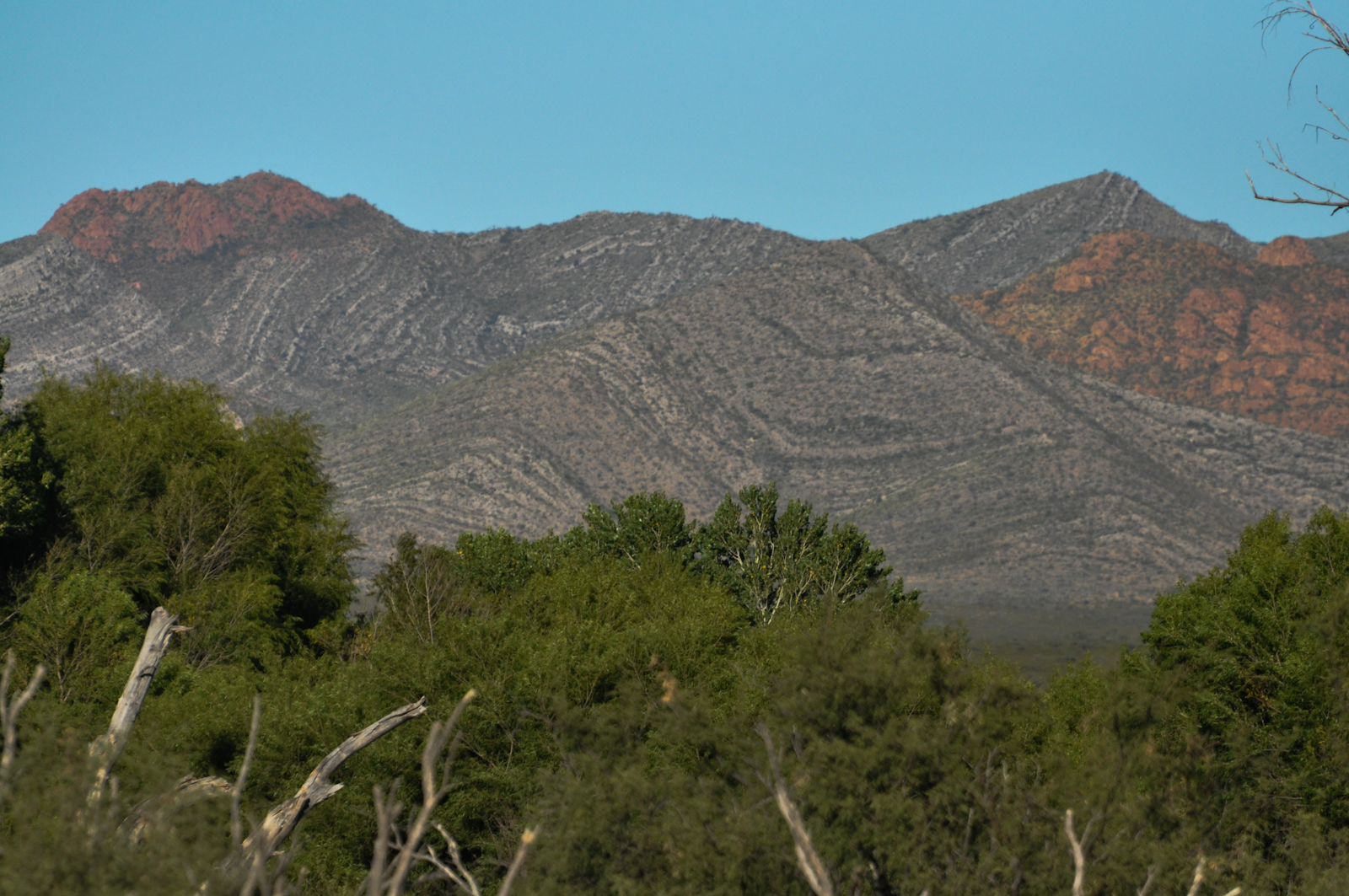
- Mule Mountains, viewed from near Hereford, Arizona

Highest point
- Peak: Mount Ballard
- Elevation: 7,374 ft (2,248 m) NAVD 88

Dimensions
- Length: 21 mi (34 km) North to South
- Width: 33 mi (53 km) East to West Extent includes low land hills and valleys
- Area: 500 mi^{2} (1,300 km^{2})

Geography
- Location within Arizona Location within the United States
- Country: United States
- State: Arizona
- Region: Madrean Sky Islands
- County: Cochise
- Range coordinates: 31°29′N 109°52′W

The Mule Mountains are a north/south running mountain range located in the south-central area of Cochise County, Arizona. The highest peak, Mount Ballard, rises to 7,500 ft (2,300 m). Prior to mining operations commencing there, the mountains were heavily forested with large Rocky Mountain Douglas-fir (Pseudotsuga menziesii glauca) and other conifers, but these were all cut down for housing needs and to feed the ore smelting furnaces in Douglas, Arizona, approximately 20 miles due east. Now, the primary vegetation of the Mules consists of manzanita (Arctostaphylos spp.) brush, juniper, lowland oaks and pines, and various grasses. To the east of the mountain range lies Sulphur Springs Valley, and the San Pedro River and Valley to the west.

The terrain is very rough, with very steep slopes descending into deep canyons. Common wildlife species include desert mule deer (Odocoileus hemionus eremicus), Coues' White-tailed deer (O. virginianus couesi), Collared Peccary (Pecari tajacu) (locally known as javalinas), various types of rodents, lizards and a wide variety of birds. It is also home to Yarrow's spiny lizard, which is impacted by rising temperatures caused by climate change, and may or may not be listed under the Endangered Species Act of 1973 pending the result of litigation. The upper ridges of the mountains consist primarily of a very hard brecciate limestone, and it is very common to find fossils of clams and snails imbedded in them.

Immediately to the east central area of the Mules lies the Lavender Pit, a large and very deep open pit copper mine dug and mined by the Phelps Dodge Corporation between 1951 through 1974. Over a billion tons of copper were extracted from the mine, along with significant quantities gold, silver and lead. Also, as a by-product of the mining operations, high quality turquoise (locally known as Bisbee Blue) was also discovered.

On the east central slope of the Mule Mountains can be found the Copper Queen Mine. In its days of production, (late 19th century – early 20th century) it was the richest copper deposit ever discovered, causing the accompanying town of Bisbee, Arizona to prosper. Under this part of the Mule Mountains are many mining tunnels dug in pursuit of the rich copper ore. Today, Bisbee (also known as the "mile-high city," at elevation 5,300 ft or 1,600 m) is largely a tourist town and retirement community along the slopes of Tombstone Canyon in the heart of the Mules. There are currently no organized mining operations in effect in the Mule Mountains. Much of the east/southeastern area of the range is private property.
