= Arizona Cactus Botanical Garden =

Former garden at Bisbee, Arizona

- Interactive map of Arizona Cactus Botanical Garden
- Type: cactus garden
- Location: Bisbee, Arizona
- Coordinates: 31.3508°N 109.8754°W
- Closed: 2005
- Founder: David L. Eppele
- Open: No
- Website: www.arizonacactus.com

The Arizona Cactus Botanical Garden was a non-profit botanical garden, located at 8 Cactus Lane, Bisbee, Arizona, United States, containing representative samples of over 800 varieties of high desert xerophyte plant life. It was founded by David L. Eppele and has been closed since his death on 19 May 2005.

The Garden featured cactus and succulents from high deserts of the Americas. All plants were cold-hardy and grown with no supplemental water. Shade frames and greenhouses contained hundreds of plants under study for hardiness and potential as landscape plants in high Southwestern deserts. The Garden's library contained over 2,000 volumes.

== See also ==
- List of botanical gardens in the United States
