= Phelps Dodge General Office Building =

- U.S. National Register of Historic Places
- U.S. National Historic Landmark
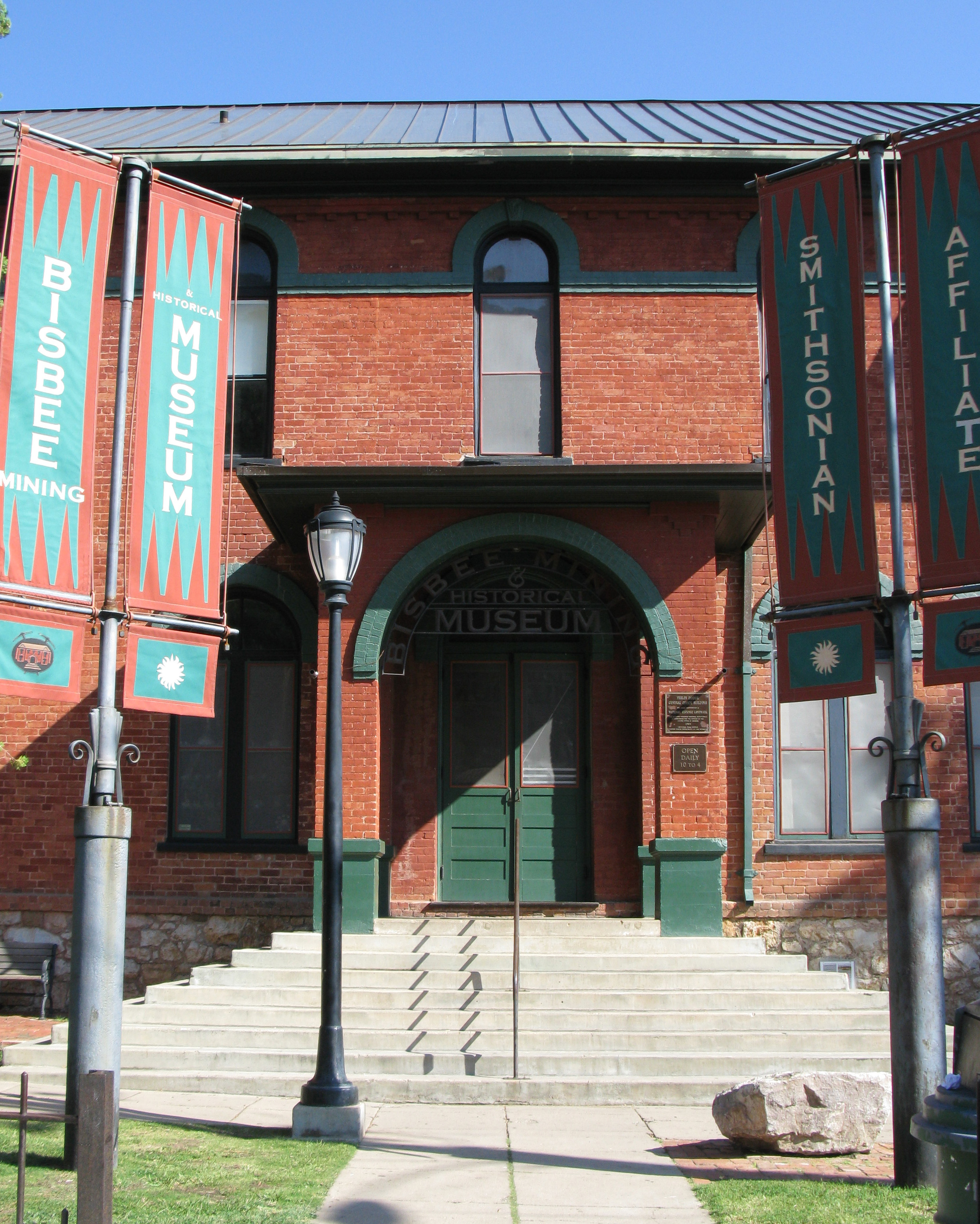
- Bisbee Mining & Historical Museum

- Location within Arizona Location within the United States
- Location: Copper Queen Plaza, Bisbee, Arizona
- Coordinates: 31°26′31.24″N 109°54′51.91″W
- Built: 1895
- Architect: Phelps Dodge Co.
- NRHP reference No.: 71000109

Significant dates
- Added to NRHP: June 3, 1971
- Designated NHL: May 4, 1983

The Bisbee Mining and Historical Museum is a local history museum at 5 Copper Queen Plaza in Bisbee, Arizona. It is located in the Phelps Dodge General Office Building, a National Historic Landmark for the importance of the Phelps Dodge Corporation's role in the growth and development of the American Southwest. The museum is dedicated primarily to local history, particularly the town's founding and growth as a mining center.

== Building ==
The Bisbee Mining and Historical Museum is located in downtown Bisbee, facing south toward Tombstone Canyon Road near its junction with Howell Avenue. It is a two-story red brick building, its main section covered by a gabled roof. A single-story ell extends to one side, and its front facade is adorned by a pair of projecting two-story polygonal bays. Windows are typically topped by rounded arches, and the main entrance is at the center of the south facade, sheltered by a portico whose rounded archway is supported by square brick posts. Several of the interior rooms have been restored to a period appearance, while others are given over to museum galleries and offices.

The building was the headquarters of the Phelps Dodge mining company from 1896 to 1961. It thereafter house county offices, and served for a time as the local post office before being adapted by the city for use as a museum in 1971. It s designated a National Historic Landmark in 1983 for its associate with Phelps Dodge, whose growth mirrored that of the country and region in the second half of the 19th century.

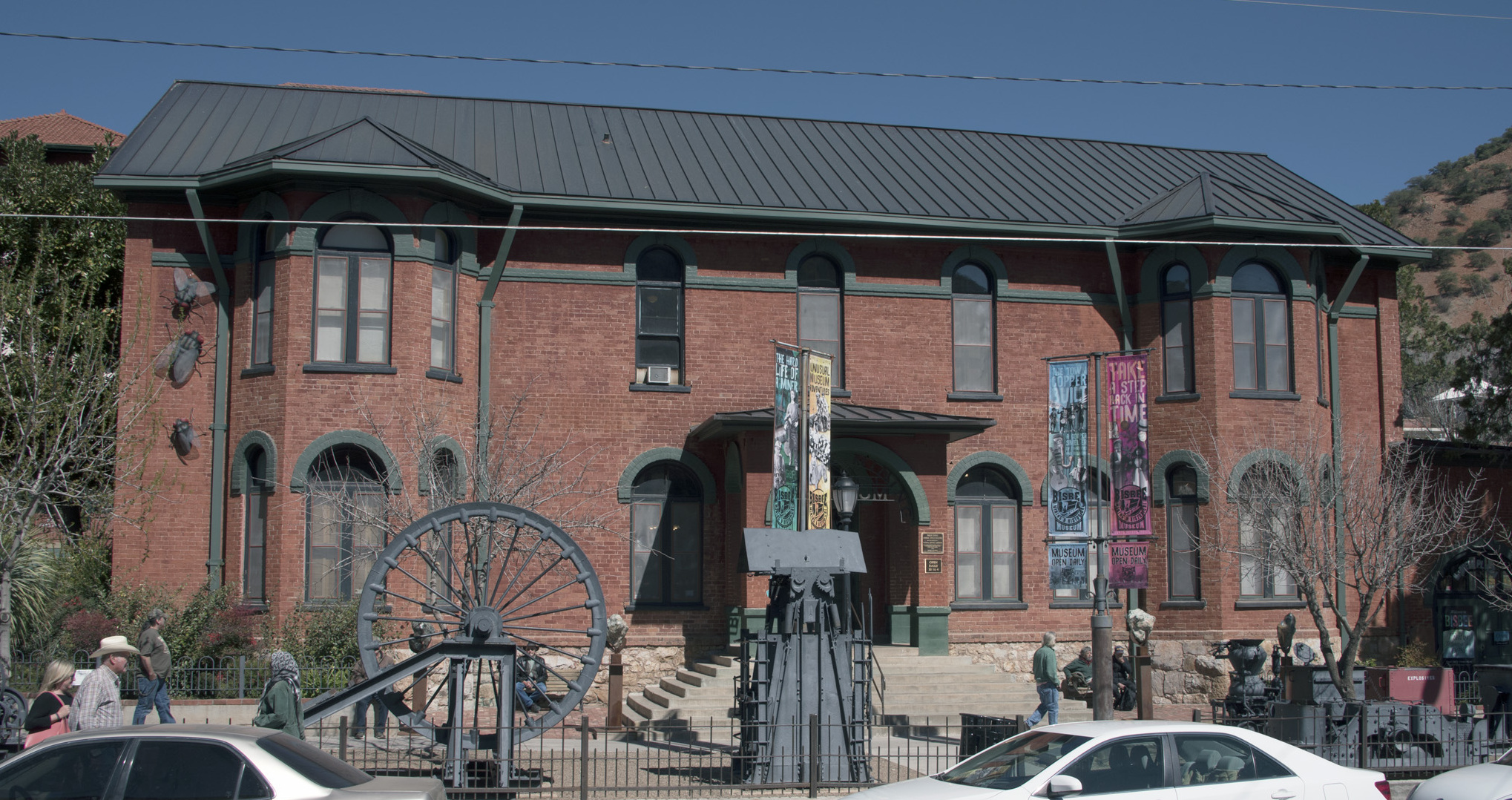
Bisbee Mining and Historical Museum in 2018

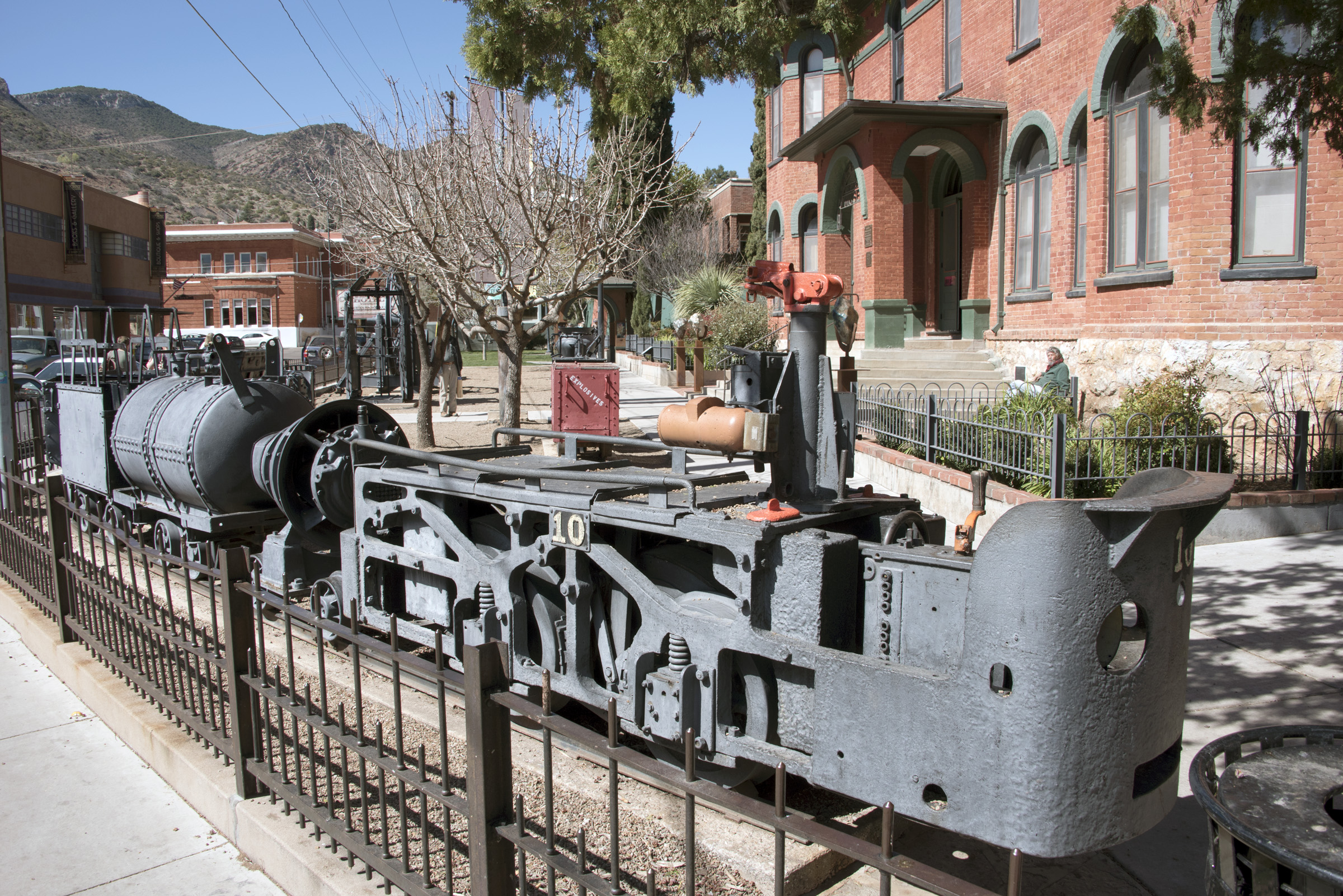
Underground mine train outside the Bisbee Mining and Historical Museum
