= Bisbee, Arizona =

City in Cochise County, Arizona, US

- City
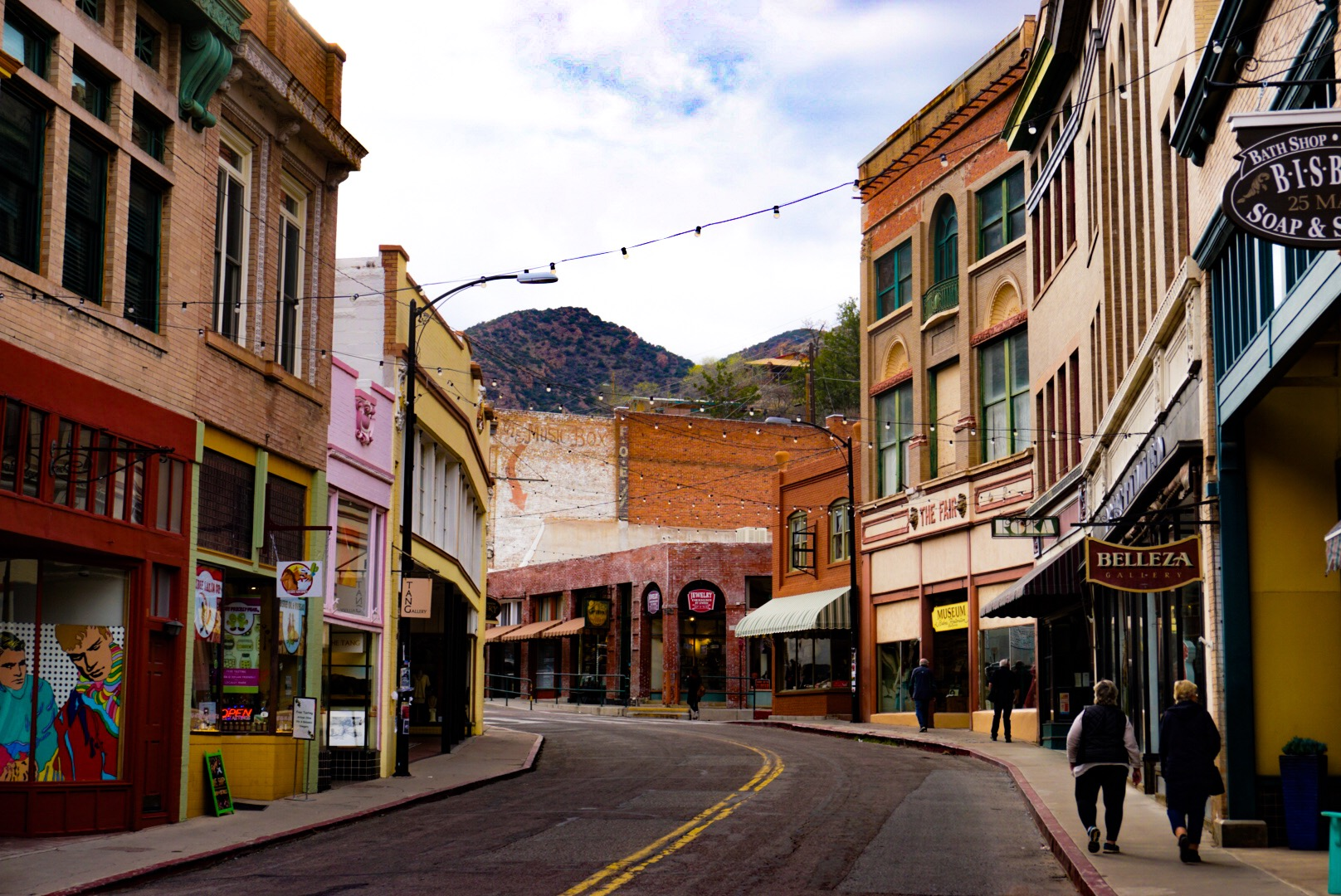
- Main Street in Bisbee (2019)

- Flag Logo
- Motto: "Queen of the Copper Camps"
- Location of Bisbee in Cochise County, Arizona
- Coordinates: 31°26′53″N 109°55′42″W
- Country: United States
- State: Arizona
- County: Cochise
- Incorporated: January 9, 1902

Government
  - Type: Council-manager
  - Body: Bisbee City Council
  - Mayor: Ken Budge
  - City Manager: Stephen J. Pauken

Area
  - Total: 5.18 sq mi (13.41 km^{2})
  - Land: 5.18 sq mi (13.41 km^{2})
  - Water: 0 sq mi (0.00 km^{2})
- Elevation: 5,538 ft (1,688 m)

Population (2020)
  - Total: 4,923
  - Density: 950.8/sq mi (367.11/km^{2})
- Time zone: UTC−07:00 (MST (no daylight saving time))
- ZIP Code: 85603
- Area code: 520
- FIPS code: 04-06260
- GNIS feature ID: 1436
- Website: bisbeeaz.gov

Bisbee is a city in and the county seat of Cochise County in southeastern Arizona, United States. According to the 2020 census, the population of the town was 4,923, down from 5,575 in the 2010 census.

== History ==
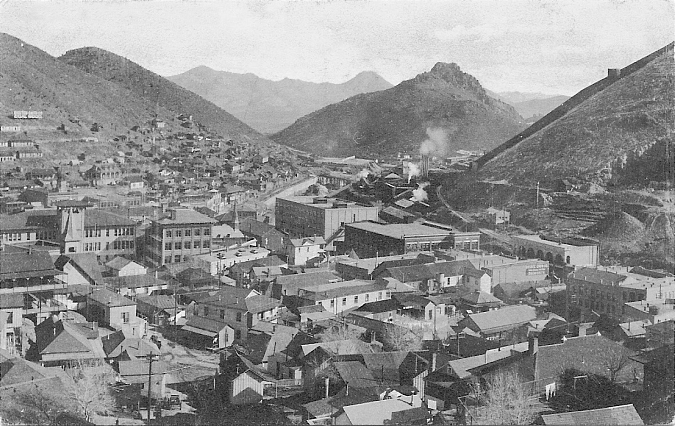
Bisbee, looking east, 1909

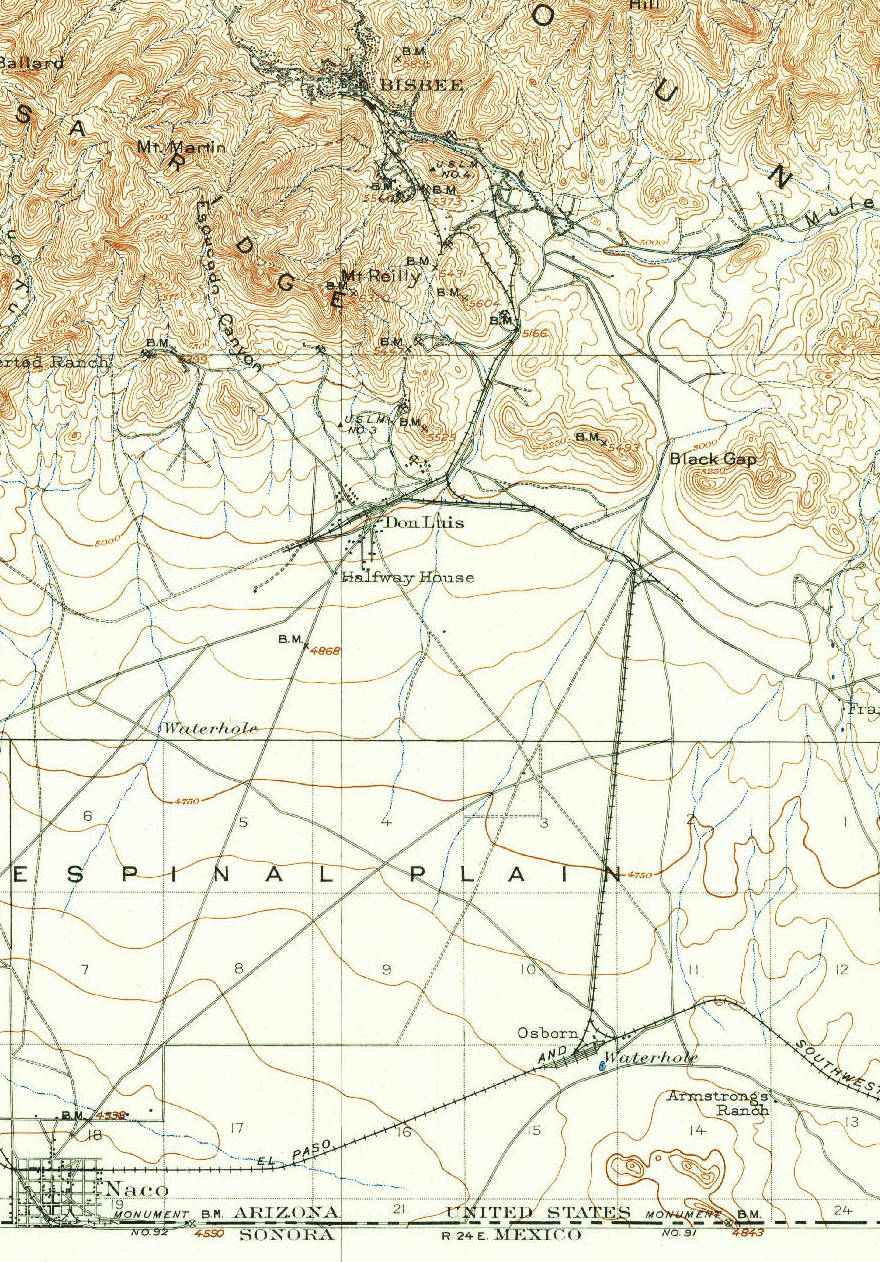
Bisbee was founded as a copper, gold, and silver mining town; topographical map from 1902

Bisbee was founded as a copper, gold, and silver mining town in 1880, and named in honor of Judge DeWitt Bisbee, one of the financial backers of the adjacent Copper Queen Mine.

The town was the site of the Bisbee Riot in 1919.

In 1929, the county seat was moved from Tombstone to Bisbee, where it remains.

=== Mining industry ===
Mining in the Mule Mountains proved quite successful: in the early 20th century the population of Bisbee soared. Incorporated in 1902, by 1910 its population had swelled to 9,019, the third largest in the territory, and it sported a constellation of suburbs, including Warren, Lowell, and San Jose, some of which had been founded on their own (ultimately less successful) mines. In 1917, open-pit mining was successfully introduced to meet the copper demand during World War I.

A high quality turquoise promoted as Bisbee Blue was a by-product of the copper mining. Many high-quality mineral specimens have come from Bisbee area mines and are to be found in museum collections worldwide. Some of these minerals include cuprite, aragonite, wulfenite, malachite, azurite, and galena.

=== Bisbee deportation ===
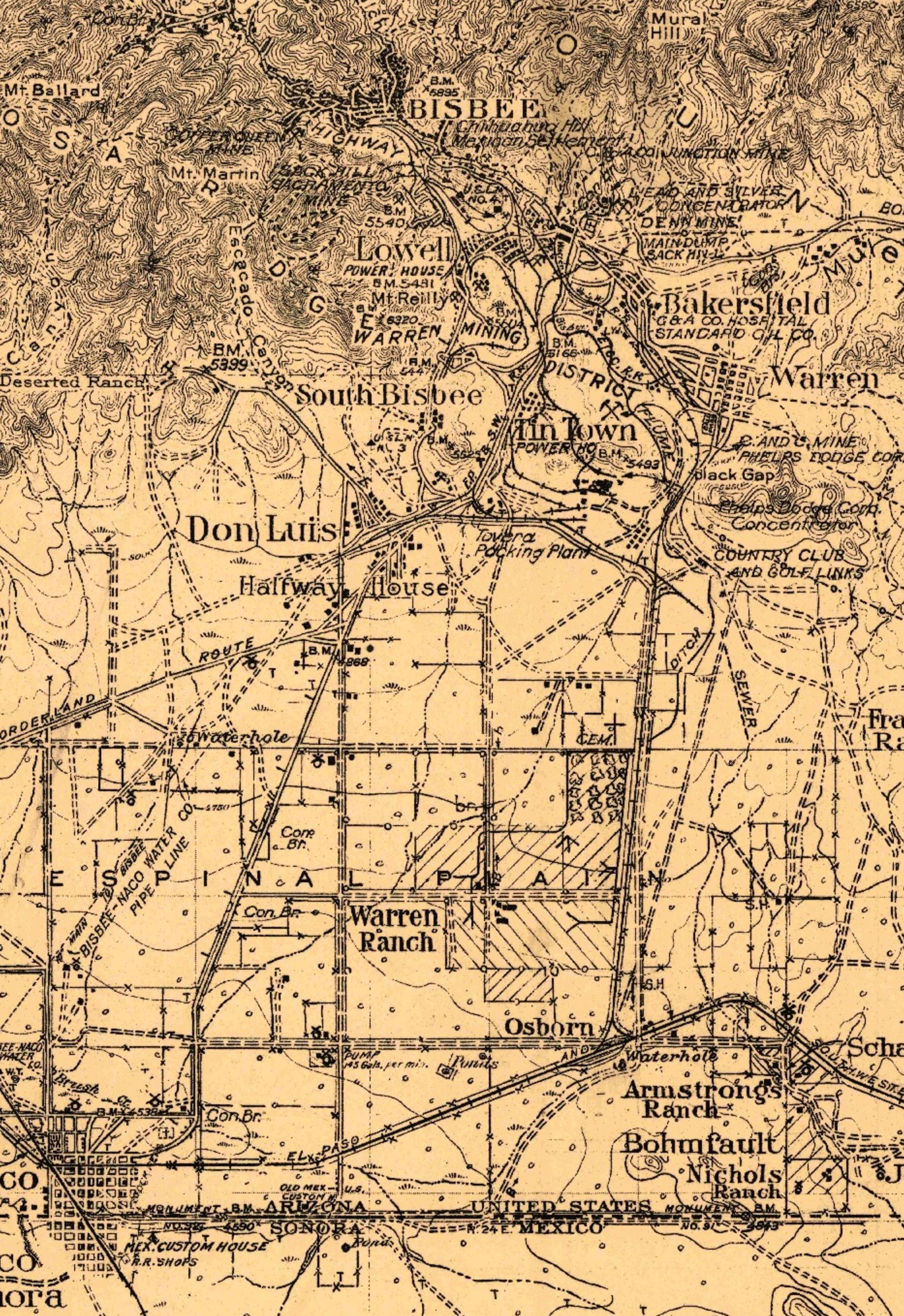
In 1927 it sported a constellation of suburbs such as Tin Town, Bakersfield, and Halfway House. Warren was the first planned community.

Miners attempted to organize to gain better working conditions and wages. In 1917, the Phelps Dodge Corporation, using private police and deputized sheriffs in conjunction with Cochise County Sheriff Harry C. Wheeler, kidnapped at gunpoint over 1,000 striking miners, packed them into cattle cars, and shipped them for sixteen hours through the desert without food or water to the town to Hermanas, New Mexico, due to allegations that they were members of the Industrial Workers of the World (IWW). The company wanted to prevent unionization, while the IWW sought safer mining conditions and the end of discrimination between US-born and immigrant workers. Earlier that year, industry police conducted the Jerome Deportation, similarly intended to expel striking miners.

=== Mining decline and tourism ===
Continued underground work enabled the town to survive the changes in mining that caused mines in neighboring towns to close, leading to a resulting dramatic loss of population. But the population of Bisbee had dropped nearly 60%, from a high of 9,205 in 1920 down to 3,801 by 1950. In 1975 the Phelps Dodge Corporation halted its Bisbee copper-mining operations. Bisbee Mayor Chuck Eads, with the cooperation of Phelps Dodge, implemented development of a mine tour and historic interpretation of a portion of the Copper Queen Mine as part of an effort to create heritage tourism as another economic base to compensate for the financial loss due to the end of the mining industry.

Community volunteers cleared tons of fallen rock and re-timbered the old workings. Eventually, this local effort came to the attention of the federal Economic Development Administration. It approved a large grant to Bisbee to help the mine tour project and other improvements in downtown Bisbee; these were designed to meet tourist business needs. The Queen Mine Tour was officially opened to visitors on February 1, 1976. More than a million visitors have taken the underground mine tour train.

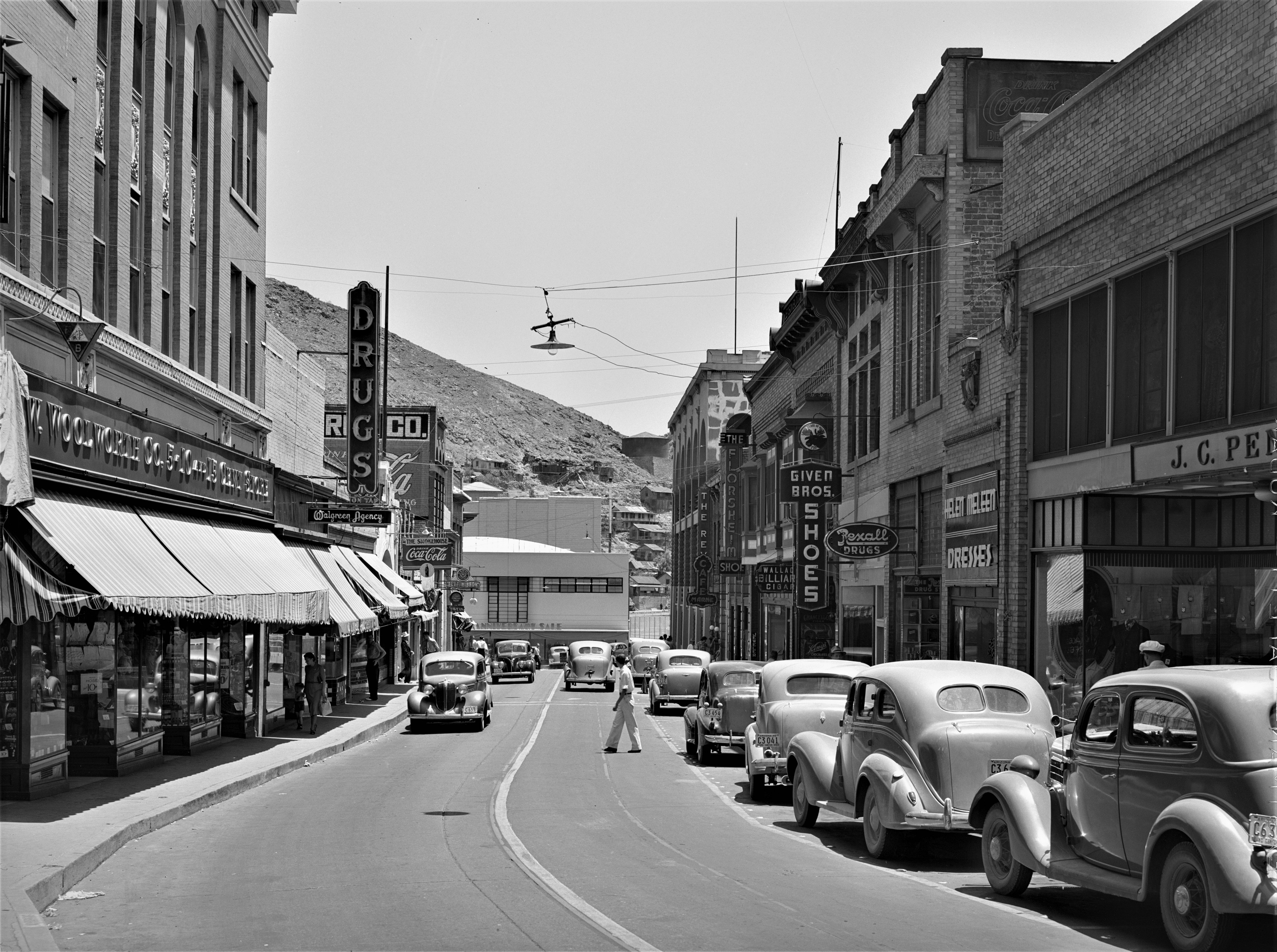
Downtown Bisbee, May 1940. Photo by Russell Lee. Compare to the 1990 photo below (gallery).

=== Modern Bisbee ===
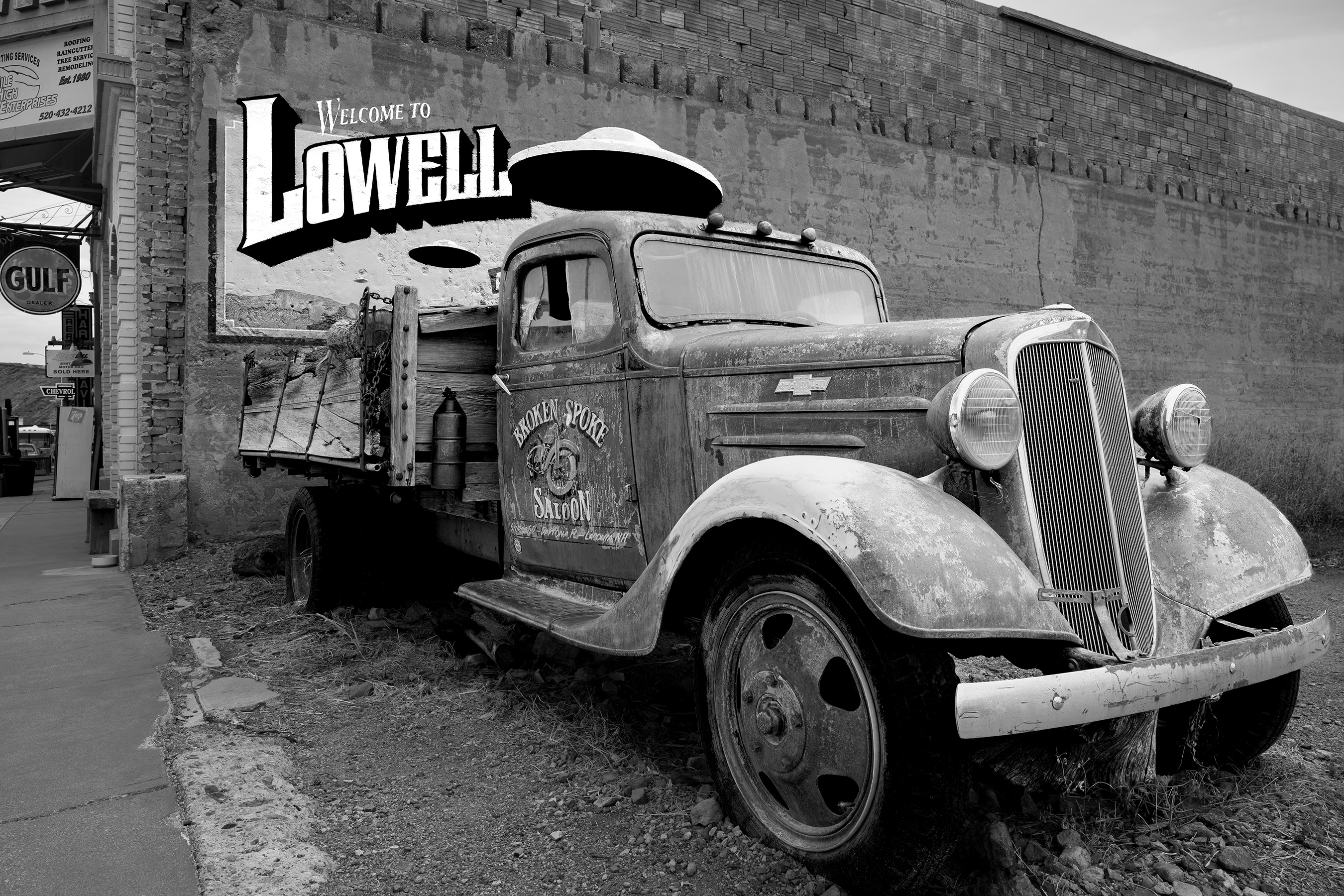
Erie Street, Historic Lowell ghost town, Bisbee

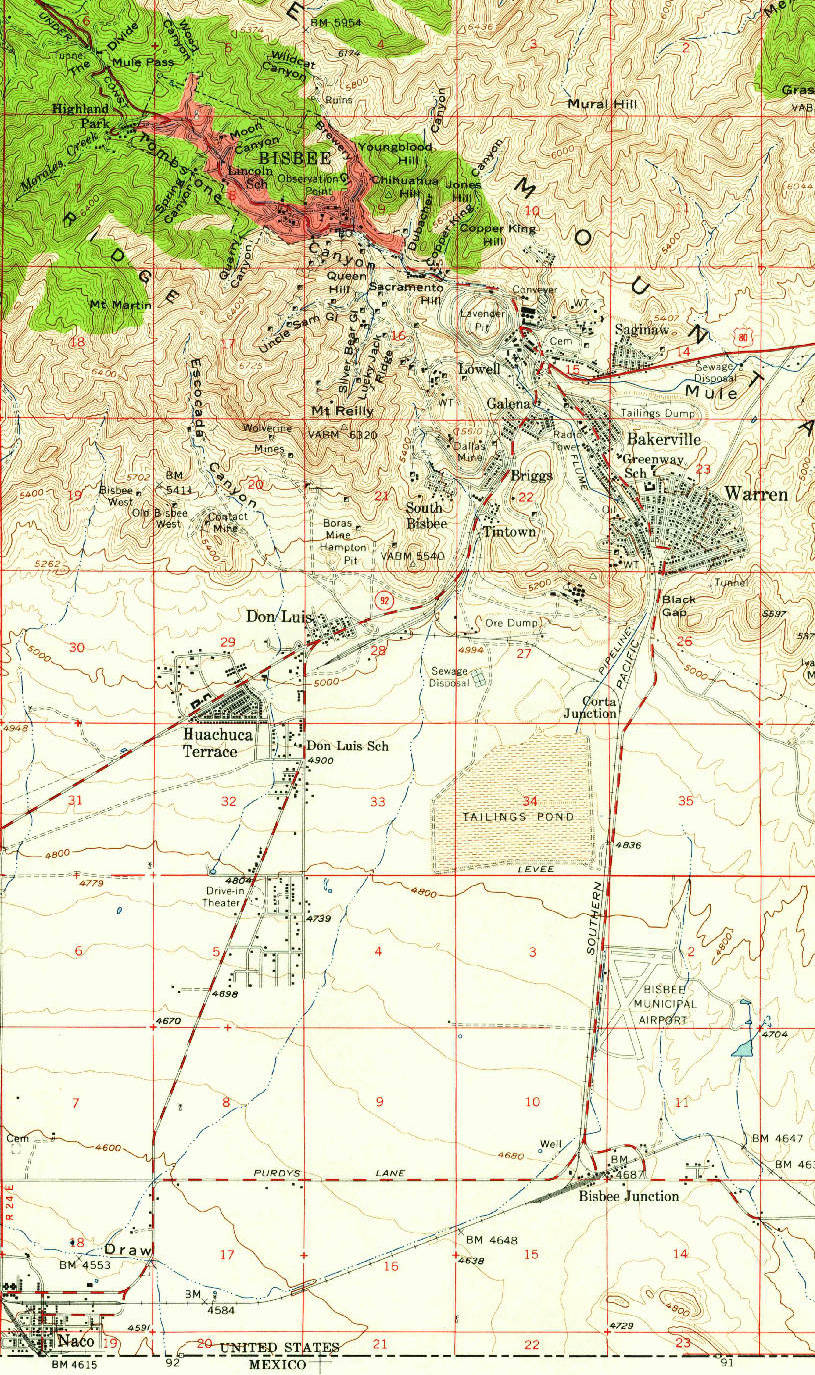
Bisbee in 1958 was at its height of economic mining development.

From 1950 to 1960, the sharp population decline happening over the previous few decades changed course and the number of residents of Bisbee increased by nearly 160 percent when open-pit mining was undertaken and the city annexed nearby areas. The peak population was in 1960, at 9,914.

In the following decade, there was a decline in jobs and population, although not as severe as from 1930 to 1950. But, the economic volatility resulted in a crash in housing prices. Coupled with an attractive climate and picturesque scenery, Bisbee became a destination in the 1960s for artists and hippies of the counter culture.

Artist Stephen Hutchison and his wife Marcia purchased the Copper Queen Hotel, the town's anchor business and architectural gem, from the Phelps-Dodge mining company in 1970. The company had tried to find a local buyer, offering the deed to any local resident for the sum of $1, but there were no takers. The property needed renovation for continued use.

Hutchison purchased and renovated the hotel, as well as other buildings in the downtown area. One held the early 20th-century Brewery and Stock Exchange. Hutchison began to market Bisbee as a destination of the "authentic," old Southwest. His work attracted the developer Ed Smart.

Among the many guests at the hotel have been celebrities from nearby California. Actor John Wayne was a frequent visitor to Bisbee and the Copper Queen. He befriended Hutchison and eventually partnered with Smart in his real estate ventures. This period of Bisbee's history is well documented in contemporary articles in The New Yorker and in an article by Cynthia Buchanan in The Cornell Review. It was at this time that Bisbee became a haven for artists and hippies fleeing the larger cities of Arizona and California. Later it attracted people priced out by gentrification of places such as Aspen, Colorado.

In the 1990s, additional people were attracted to Bisbee, leading it to develop such amenities as coffee shops and live theatre. Many of the old houses have been renovated, and property values in Bisbee now greatly exceed those of other southeastern Arizona cities.

Today, the historic Bisbee is known as "Old Bisbee" and is home to a thriving downtown cultural scene. This area is noted for its architecture, including Victorian-style houses and an elegant Art Deco county courthouse. Because its plan was laid out to a pedestrian scale before the automobile, Old Bisbee is compact and walkable. The town's hilly terrain is exemplified by the old four-story high school; each floor has a ground-level entrance.

==== Suburbs ====
Bisbee now includes the satellite communities of Warren, Lowell, and San Jose. The Lowell and Warren townsites were consolidated into Bisbee proper during the early part of the twentieth century. There are also smaller neighborhoods interspersed between these larger boroughs, including Galena, Bakerville, Tintown, Briggs, and Saginaw.

The former neighborhood of South Bisbee no longer exists. The land is owned by the mining company Freeport McMoRan and they evicted the residents in 2013.

Warren was Arizona's first planned community. It was designed as a bedroom community for the more affluent citizens of the mining district. Warren has a fine collection of Arts and Crafts style bungalow houses. Many have been recognized as historic places, and the city has an annual home tour during which a varying selection are offered for tours. Since the end of mining in the 1970s, Warren has seen a steady decline in its standard of living. The residential district still houses a significant portion of the population, and includes City Hall, Greenway Elementary School, Bisbee High School, and the historic Warren Ballpark.

Lowell was at one time a sizable mining town located just to the southeast of Old Bisbee. The majority of the original townsite was consumed by the excavation of the Lavender Pit mine during the 1950s. All that is left today is a small portion of Erie Street, along with Evergreen Cemetery, Saginaw subdivision and Lowell Middle School. These days Lowell is considered by most of the local residents to be more of a place name than an operating community.

San Jose, on the southern side of the Mule Mountains, is the most modern of the city's subdivisions. As it is not restricted by mountains, it has had the most new growth since the late 1990s. Named after a nearby Mexican mountain peak, it is the location of many newer county government buildings, the Huachuca Terrace Elementary School, and a large shopping center.

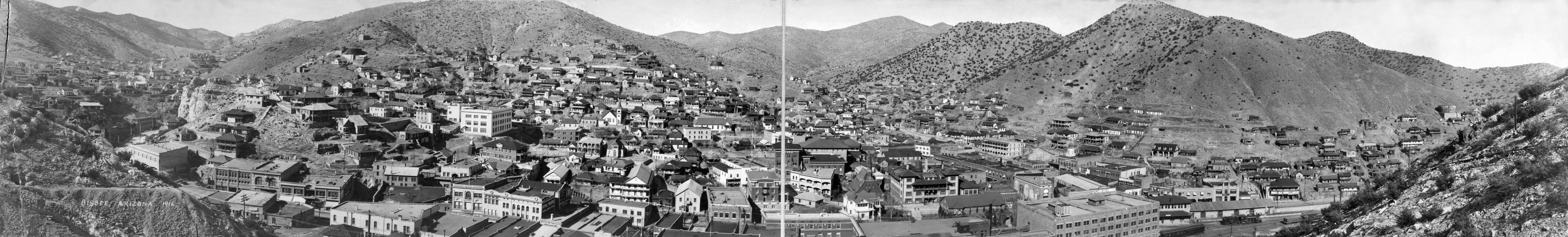
Bisbee, 1916
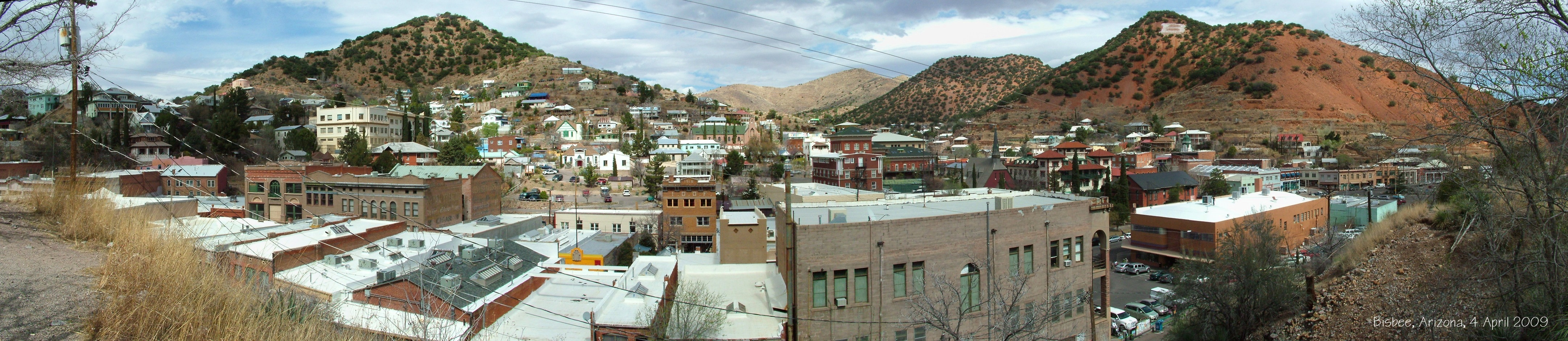
Bisbee, 2009

==== Current state of mining industry ====
In 2007, Freeport-McMoRan Copper & Gold bought the Phelps-Dodge company. Freeport has invested in Bisbee by remediating soil contaminated in previous mining operations, donations to the school system, and other civic activities.

== Geography ==
Arizona State Route 80 runs through the city, leading northwest 23 miles (37 km) to Tombstone and 47 miles (76 km) to Benson, and east 26 miles (42 km) to Douglas. The Mexican border at Naco is 11 miles (18 km) south of the center of Bisbee.

According to the United States Census Bureau, the city has a total area of 5.2 square miles (13.4 km^{2}), all land.

Natural vegetation around Bisbee has a semi-desert appearance with shrubby acacia, oak and the like, along with cacti, grass, ocotillo and yucca. The town itself is much more luxuriant with large trees such as native cypress, sycamore and cottonwood plus the introduced ailanthus and Old World cypresses, cedars and pines. Palms are capable of growing tall, but are not reliably hardy. At least one mature blue spruce may be seen.

=== Climate ===
Bisbee is a typical semi-arid climate (Köppen BSk) of the upland Mountain West. Summer days are warm to hot and dry before the monsoon brings the wettest season from July to September with 10.65 inches (270.5 mm) of Bisbee's total annual rainfall of 18.63 inches (473.2 mm), often with severe thunderstorms. During the winter, frontal cloudbands may bring occasional rainfall or even snowfall, though average maxima in the winter are typically very mild and sometimes even warm.

Climate data for Bisbee, Arizona (1991–2020 normals, extremes 1985–2021)
Month	Jan	Feb	Mar	Apr	May	Jun	Jul	Aug	Sep	Oct	Nov	Dec	Year
Record high °F (°C)	74 (23)	80 (27)	87 (31)	93 (34)	98 (37)	106 (41)	103 (39)	97 (36)	91 (33)	90 (32)	85 (29)	77 (25)	106 (41)
Mean maximum °F (°C)	66.7 (19.3)	71.5 (21.9)	77.2 (25.1)	82.9 (28.3)	90.6 (32.6)	96.8 (36.0)	96.0 (35.6)	92.1 (33.4)	88.7 (31.5)	84.4 (29.1)	75.4 (24.1)	68.4 (20.2)	97.9 (36.6)
Mean daily maximum °F (°C)	55.8 (13.2)	59.7 (15.4)	66.9 (19.4)	73.4 (23.0)	80.9 (27.2)	89.3 (31.8)	87.4 (30.8)	84.8 (29.3)	81.6 (27.6)	74.9 (23.8)	64.0 (17.8)	56.2 (13.4)	72.9 (22.7)
Daily mean °F (°C)	44.0 (6.7)	47.2 (8.4)	52.6 (11.4)	58.7 (14.8)	66.0 (18.9)	74.7 (23.7)	75.3 (24.1)	72.9 (22.7)	69.0 (20.6)	61.3 (16.3)	51.4 (10.8)	44.4 (6.9)	59.8 (15.4)
Mean daily minimum °F (°C)	32.2 (0.1)	34.7 (1.5)	38.2 (3.4)	44.0 (6.7)	51.2 (10.7)	60.1 (15.6)	63.2 (17.3)	61.1 (16.2)	56.5 (13.6)	47.7 (8.7)	38.8 (3.8)	32.6 (0.3)	46.7 (8.2)
Mean minimum °F (°C)	20.0 (−6.7)	22.0 (−5.6)	26.3 (−3.2)	31.2 (−0.4)	39.2 (4.0)	51.0 (10.6)	57.1 (13.9)	55.4 (13.0)	48.7 (9.3)	35.3 (1.8)	26.3 (−3.2)	20.1 (−6.6)	16.2 (−8.8)
Record low °F (°C)	10 (−12)	2 (−17)	18 (−8)	22 (−6)	26 (−3)	37 (3)	51 (11)	46 (8)	35 (2)	19 (−7)	12 (−11)	8 (−13)	2 (−17)
Average precipitation inches (mm)	1.31 (33)	1.14 (29)	0.88 (22)	0.19 (4.8)	0.28 (7.1)	0.48 (12)	3.81 (97)	4.25 (108)	1.98 (50)	0.98 (25)	0.74 (19)	1.07 (27)	17.11 (435)
Average snowfall inches (cm)	1.4 (3.6)	0.4 (1.0)	0.6 (1.5)	0.1 (0.25)	0.0 (0.0)	0.0 (0.0)	0.0 (0.0)	0.0 (0.0)	0.0 (0.0)	0.0 (0.0)	0.2 (0.51)	0.6 (1.5)	3.3 (8.4)
Average precipitation days (≥ 0.01 inch)	4.5	4.5	2.8	1.3	1.0	3.2	13.5	12.5	6.5	3.5	2.8	4.2	60.3
Average snowy days	0.5	0.3	0.3	0.1	0.0	0.0	0.0	0.0	0.0	0.0	0.1	0.4	1.7
Source: National Weather Service Forecast Office

== Demographics ==
Historical population
Census	Pop.	Note	%±
1890	1,535		—
1910	9,019		—
1920	9,205		2.1%
1930	8,023		−12.8%
1940	5,853		−27.0%
1950	3,801		−35.1%
1960	9,914		160.8%
1970	8,328		−16.0%
1980	7,154		−14.1%
1990	6,288		−12.1%
2000	6,090		−3.1%
2010	5,575		−8.5%
2020	4,923		−11.7%
U.S. Decennial Census

Bisbee first appeared on the 1890 U.S. Census as an unincorporated village. It did not appear on the 1900 census, despite having a population of thousands (many unincorporated communities were not reported). In 1902, it incorporated as a city and has appeared on every census since 1910. On September 10, 1959, it incorporated the adjacent unincorporated villages of Lowell-South Bisbee (1950 pop. 1,136) and Warren (pop. 2,610).

=== Racial and ethnic composition ===
Bisbee city, Arizona – Racial composition Note: the US Census treats Hispanic/Latino as an ethnic category. This table excludes Latinos from the racial categories and assigns them to a separate category. Hispanics/Latinos may be of any race.
Race (NH = Non-Hispanic)	2020	2010	2000	1990	1980
White alone (NH)	60.7% (2,986)	59.3% (3,307)	62.6% (3,815)	62.2% (3,909)	65.5% (4,687)
Black alone (NH)	0.7% (33)	1.2% (67)	0.4% (22)	0.4% (25)	1.6% (112)
American Indian alone (NH)	0.5% (26)	0.9% (49)	0.8% (49)	0.6% (40)	0.5% (37)
Asian alone (NH)	0.5% (24)	0.4% (22)	0.5% (30)	0.3% (17)	0.1% (6)
Pacific Islander alone (NH)	0% (2)	0.1% (6)	0% (3)		
Other race alone (NH)	0.5% (24)	0.3% (14)	0.2% (13)	0.1% (5)	0% (0)
Multiracial (NH)	3.9% (194)	1.6% (91)	1.1% (64)	—	—
Hispanic/Latino (any race)	33.2% (1,634)	36.2% (2,019)	34.4% (2,094)	36.5% (2,292)	32.3% (2,312)

=== 2020 census ===
As of the 2020 census, Bisbee had a population of 4,923. The median age was 55.6 years. 13.7% of residents were under the age of 18 and 32.6% of residents were 65 years of age or older. For every 100 females there were 94.4 males, and for every 100 females age 18 and over there were 93.0 males age 18 and over.

93.9% of residents lived in urban areas, while 6.1% lived in rural areas.

There were 2,464 households in Bisbee, of which 15.2% had children under the age of 18 living in them. Of all households, 30.6% were married-couple households, 24.8% were households with a male householder and no spouse or partner present, and 36.7% were households with a female householder and no spouse or partner present. About 44.4% of all households were made up of individuals and 24.9% had someone living alone who was 65 years of age or older.

There were 3,138 housing units, of which 21.5% were vacant. The homeowner vacancy rate was 2.5% and the rental vacancy rate was 13.2%. The average housing unit density was 605.8 per square mile (233.9/km^{2}).

The most reported detailed ancestries in 2020 were:

- Mexican (28.8%)
- English (18.6%)
- Irish (15.5%)
- German (14.8%)
- Scottish (4.5%)
- French (3.5%)
- Italian (3.3%)
- Polish (1.8%)
- Dutch (1.7%)
- Swedish (1.6%)

=== 2000 census ===
As of the census of 2000, there were 6,090 people, 2,810 households, and 1,503 families residing in the city. The population density was 1,266.3 inhabitants per square mile (488.9/km^{2}).

There were 2,810 households, out of which 21.7% had children under the age of 18 living with them, 36.8% were married couples living together, 12.8% had a female householder with no husband present, and 46.5% were non-families. 39.1% of all households were made up of individuals, and 14.6% had someone living alone who was 65 years of age or older. The average household size was 2.15 and the average family size was 2.90.

In the city, the age distribution of the population shows 21.6% under the age of 18, 6.8% from 18 to 24, 24.1% from 25 to 44, 27.8% from 45 to 64, and 19.6% who were 65 years of age or older. The median age was 43 years. For every 100 females, there were 90.6 males. For every 100 females age 18 and over, there were 85.1 males.

=== Income and poverty ===
The median income for a household in the city was $27,942, and the median income for a family was $36,685. Males had a median income of $29,573 versus $23,269 for females. The per capita income for the city was $17,129. About 12.9% of families and 17.5% of the population were below the poverty line, including 23.2% of those under age 18 and 9.0% of those age 65 or over.

=== Other demographic data ===
An analysis of United States Census Bureau data by researchers at The Williams Institute at the UCLA School of Law found that, on a proportional basis, Bisbee had more gay couples living together than anywhere else in the state. The ratio was 20.9 for every 1,000 households.

== Arts and culture ==
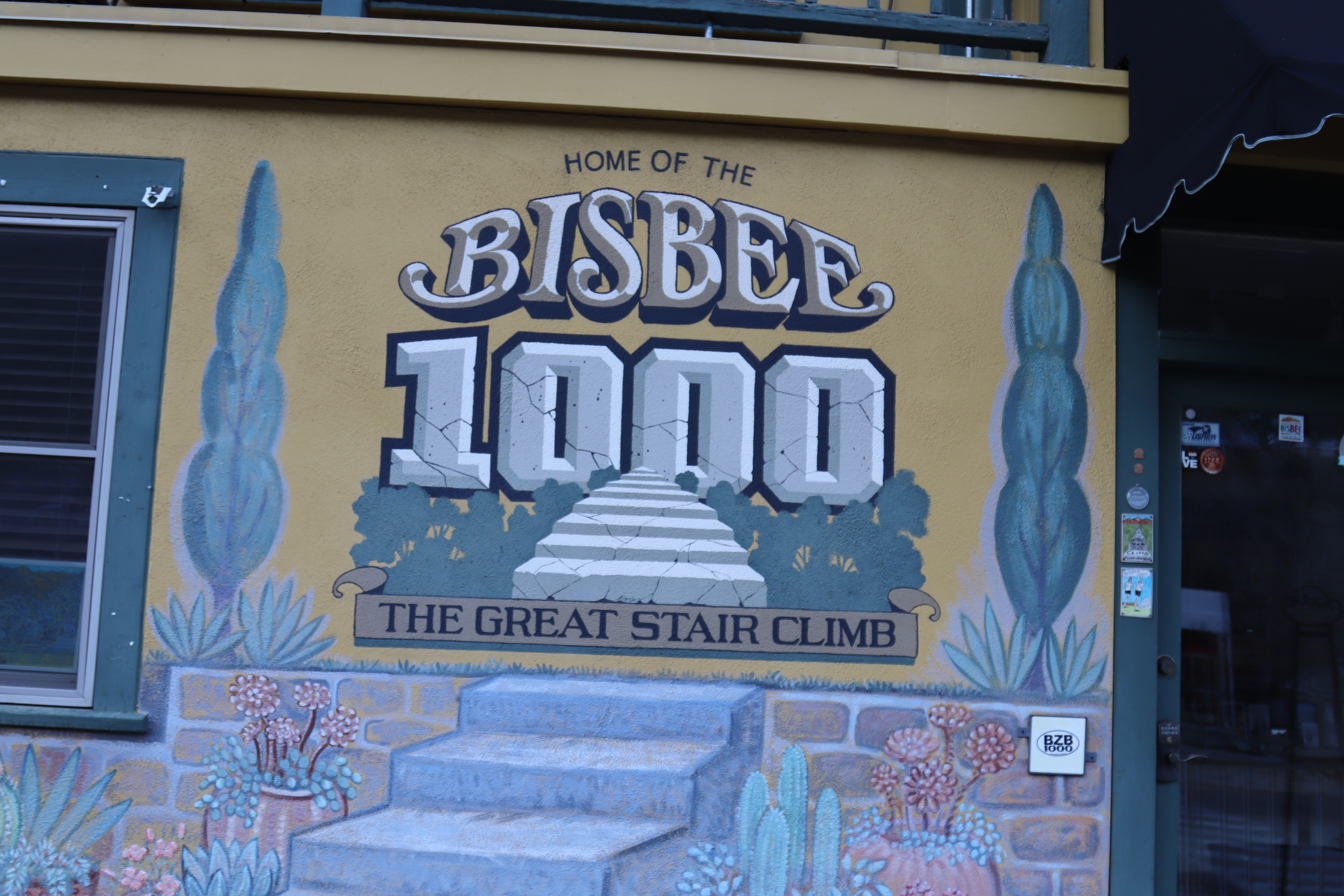
Mural for the Bisbee 1000 Stair Climb

The Bisbee 1000 Stair Climb is a five-kilometer run through the city that traverses 1,034 stairs. Billed as "the most unique physical fitness challenge in the USA!" by the organizers, the Climb includes runners being serenaded by musicians at various locations among the stairs. The event has grown to include the Ice Man Competition, designed to honor the history of men delivering blocks of ice by hand before the advent of refrigeration. In the Ice Man Competition, entrants race up 155 steps carrying a ten-pound block of ice with antique ice tongs.

Since 2015, Bisbee has hosted an annual Blues festival during the second week of September. The festival effectively lengthens the tourist season, and provides a large amount of business to local bars and breweries.

=== Sites of interest ===
- Bisbee Municipal Airport
- The Central School, built in 1905, was once an elementary school and now functions as an art center.
- The Cochise County Courthouse is built in the Art Deco style.
- The Copper Queen Mine was once a major copper producer and can be toured daily.
- The Phelps Dodge General Office Building, a National Historic Landmark, is now the Bisbee Mining & Historical Museum
- The Lavender Pit is an inactive open pit mine site in the center of the city.
- Warren Ballpark, a baseball stadium built in 1909, has housed a number of professional teams and may be baseball's oldest park still in use.
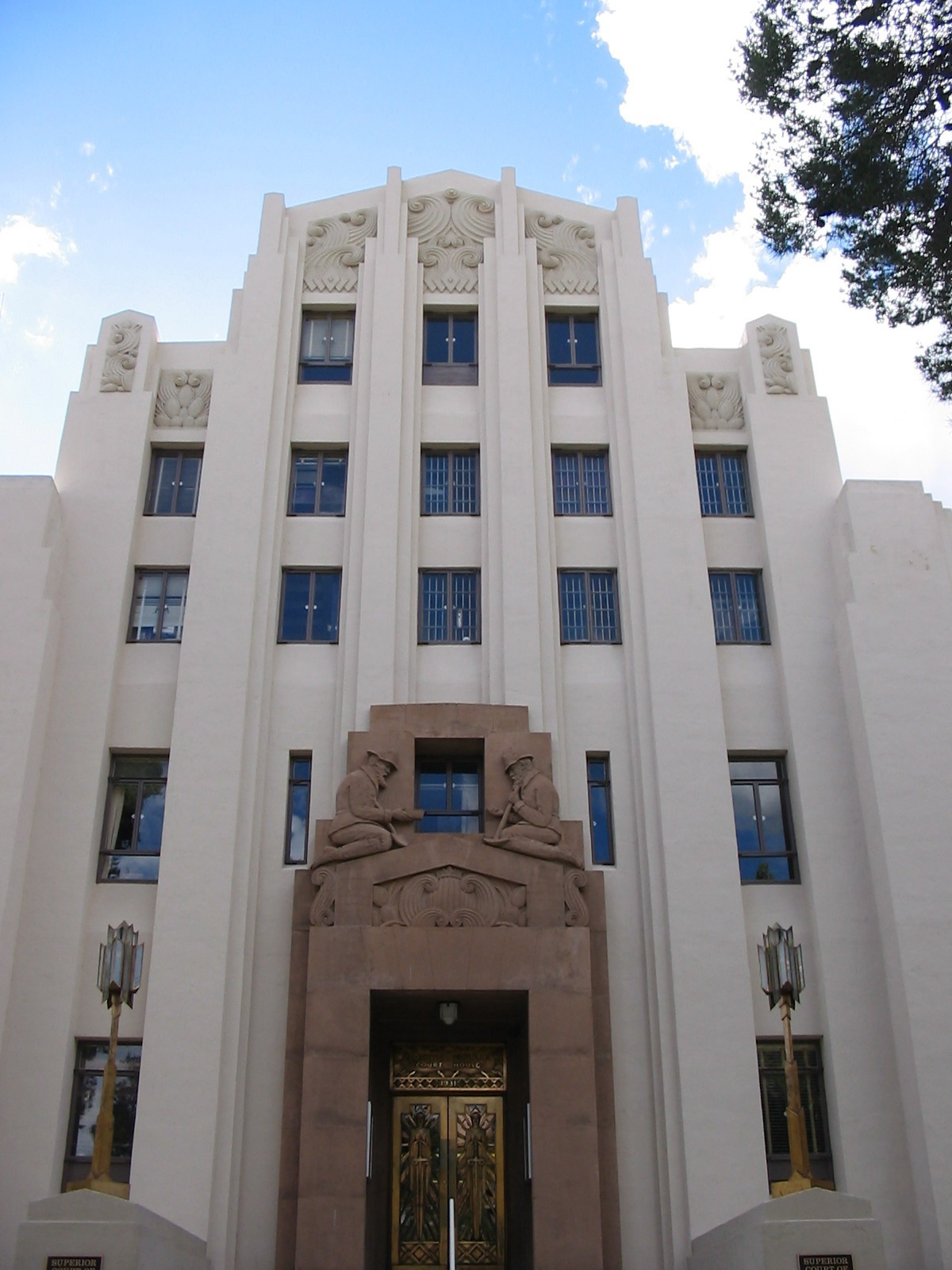
Cochise County Courthouse

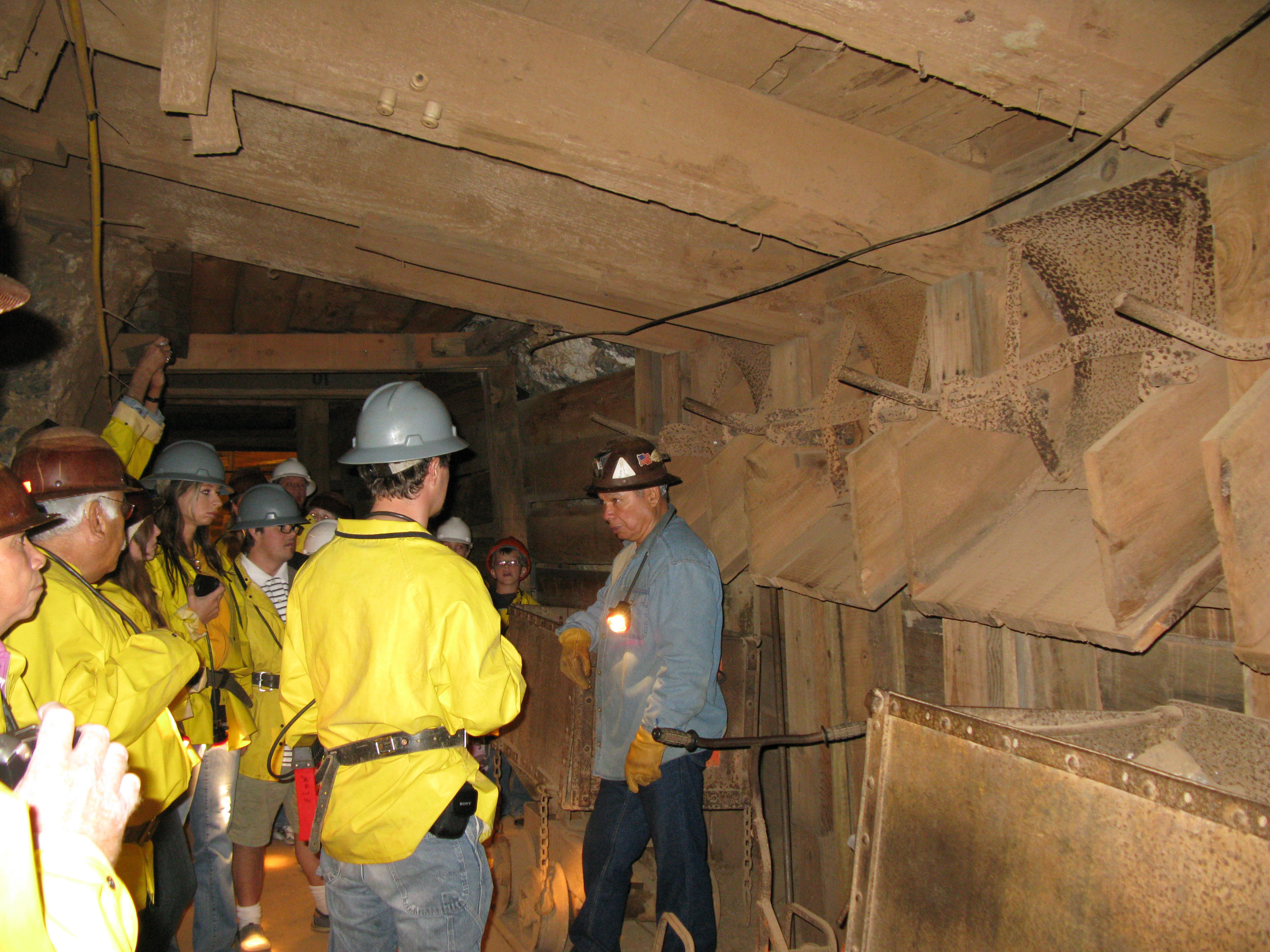
Copper Queen Mine Tour

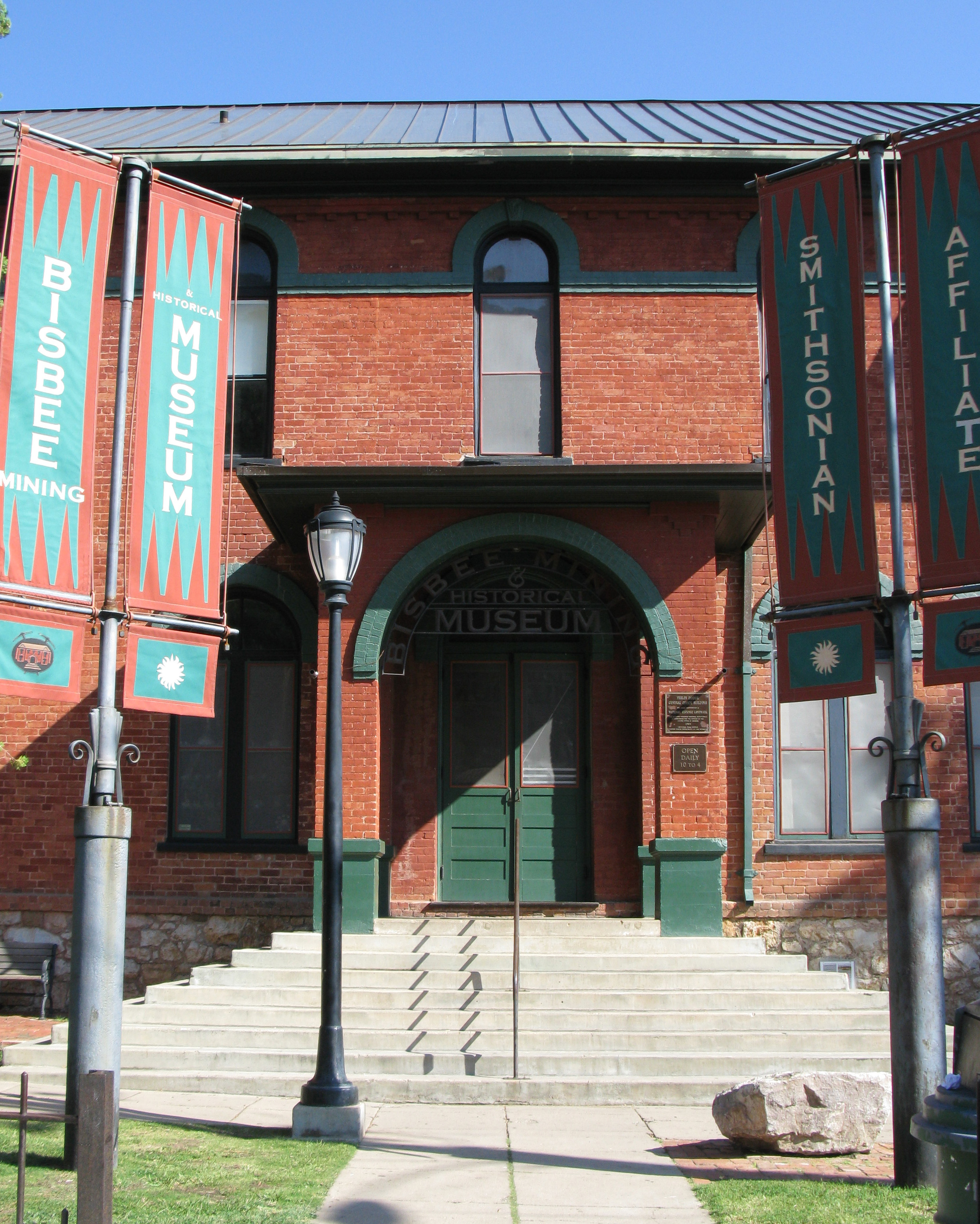
Bisbee Mining & Historical Museum

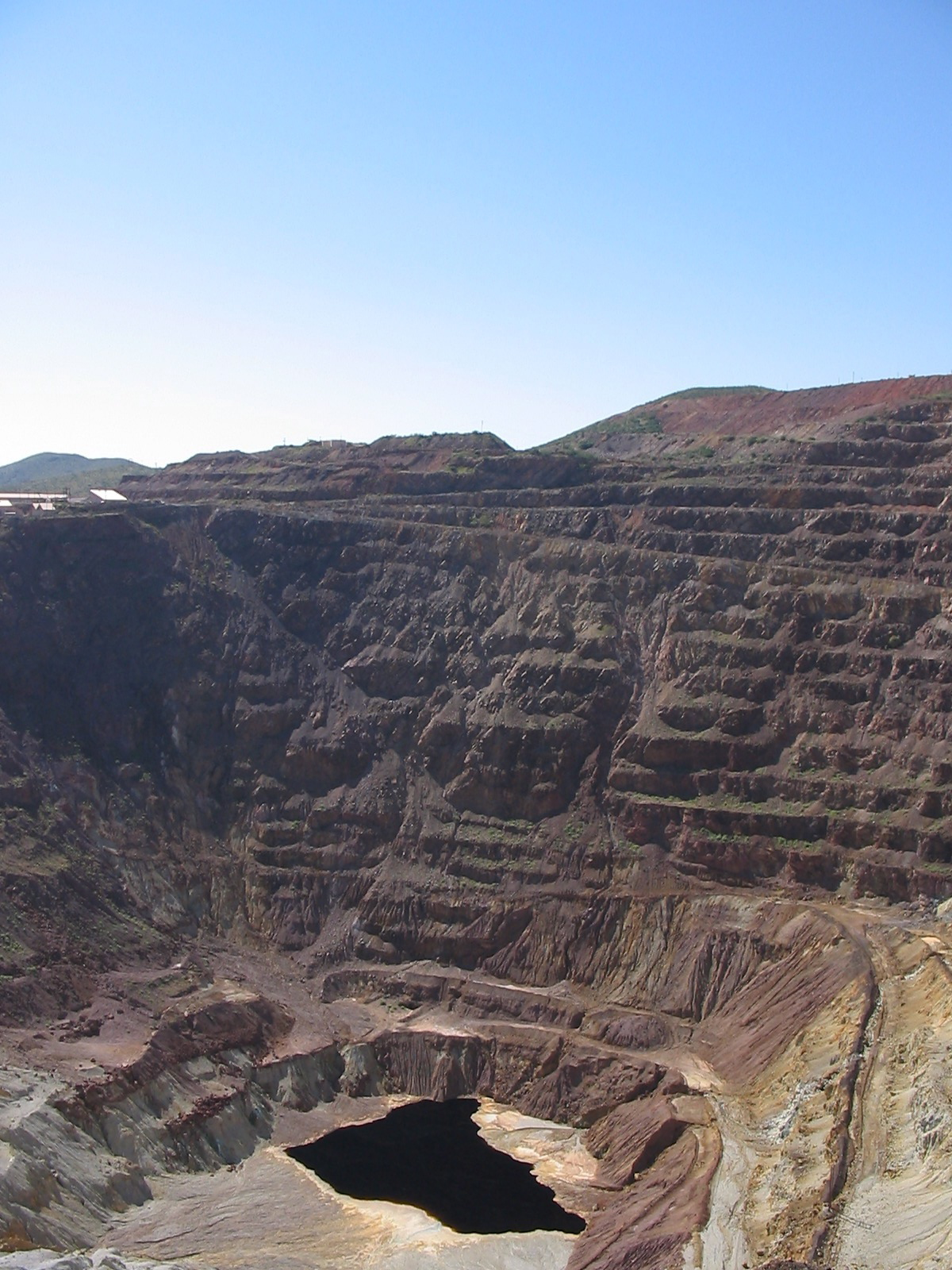
The Lavender Pit

Copper Queen Hotel

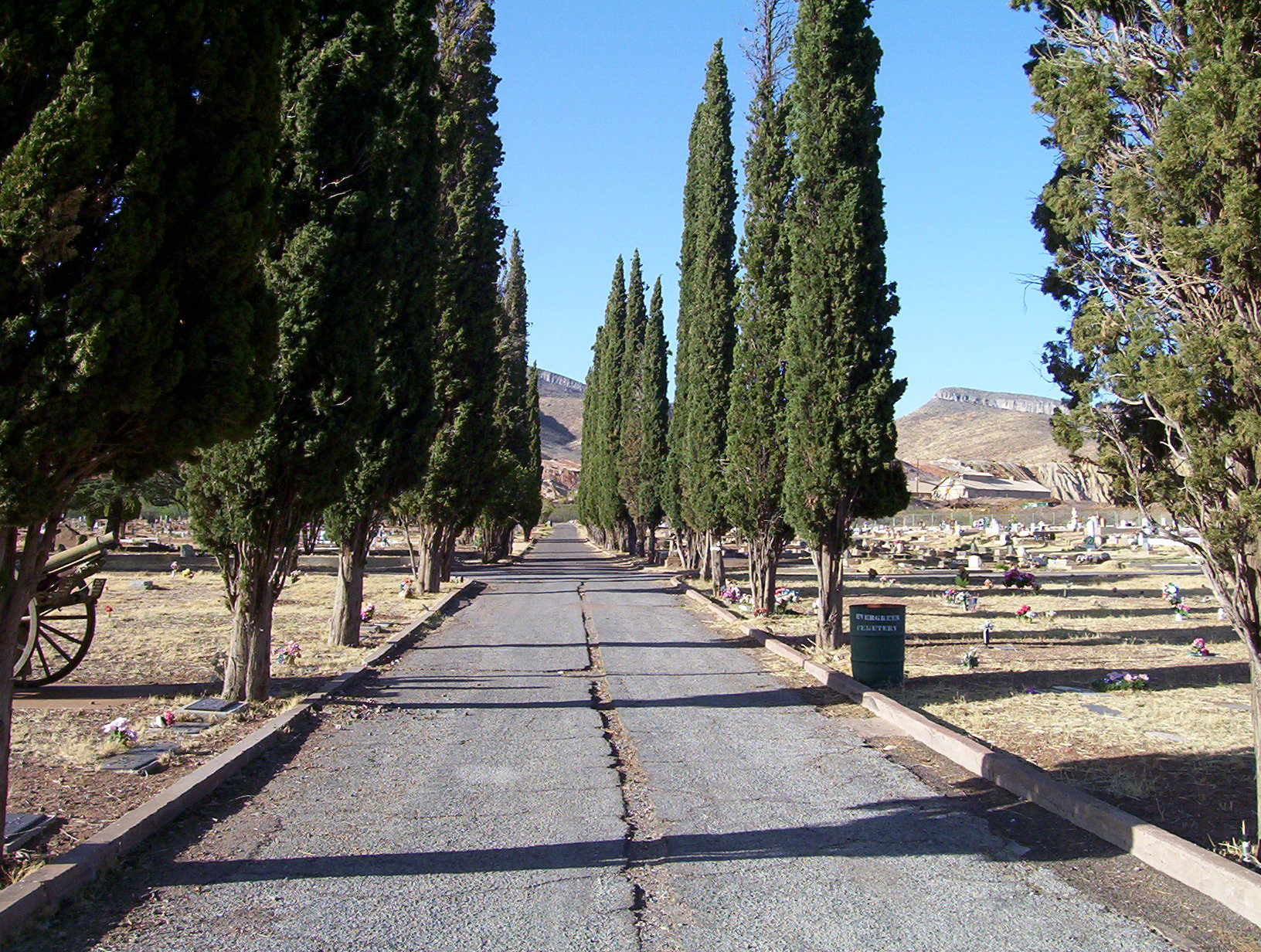
Evergreen Cemetery

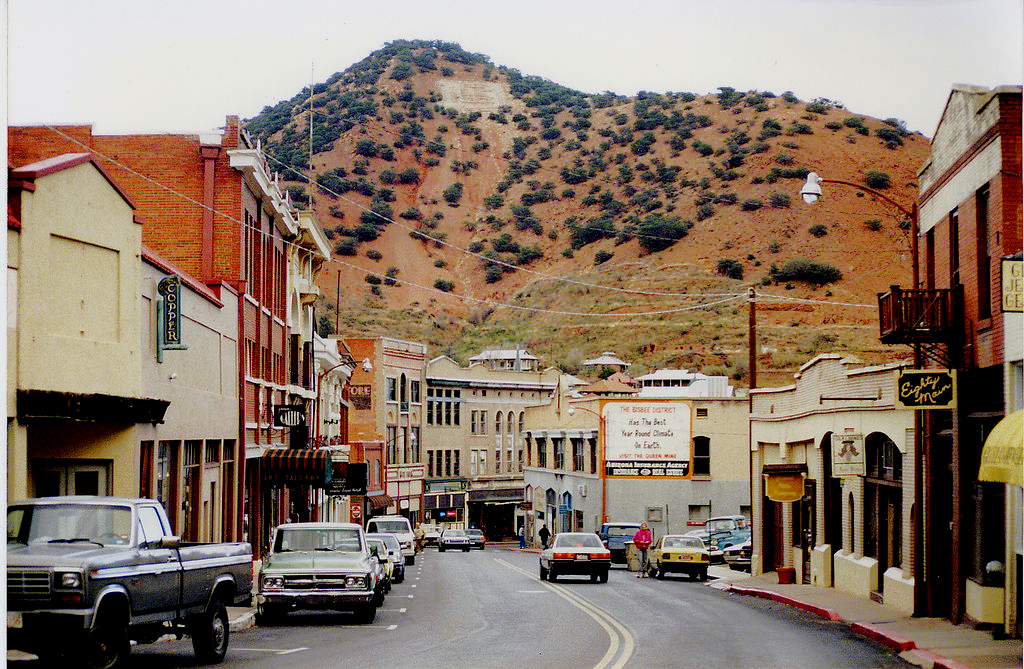
Downtown Bisbee, 1990

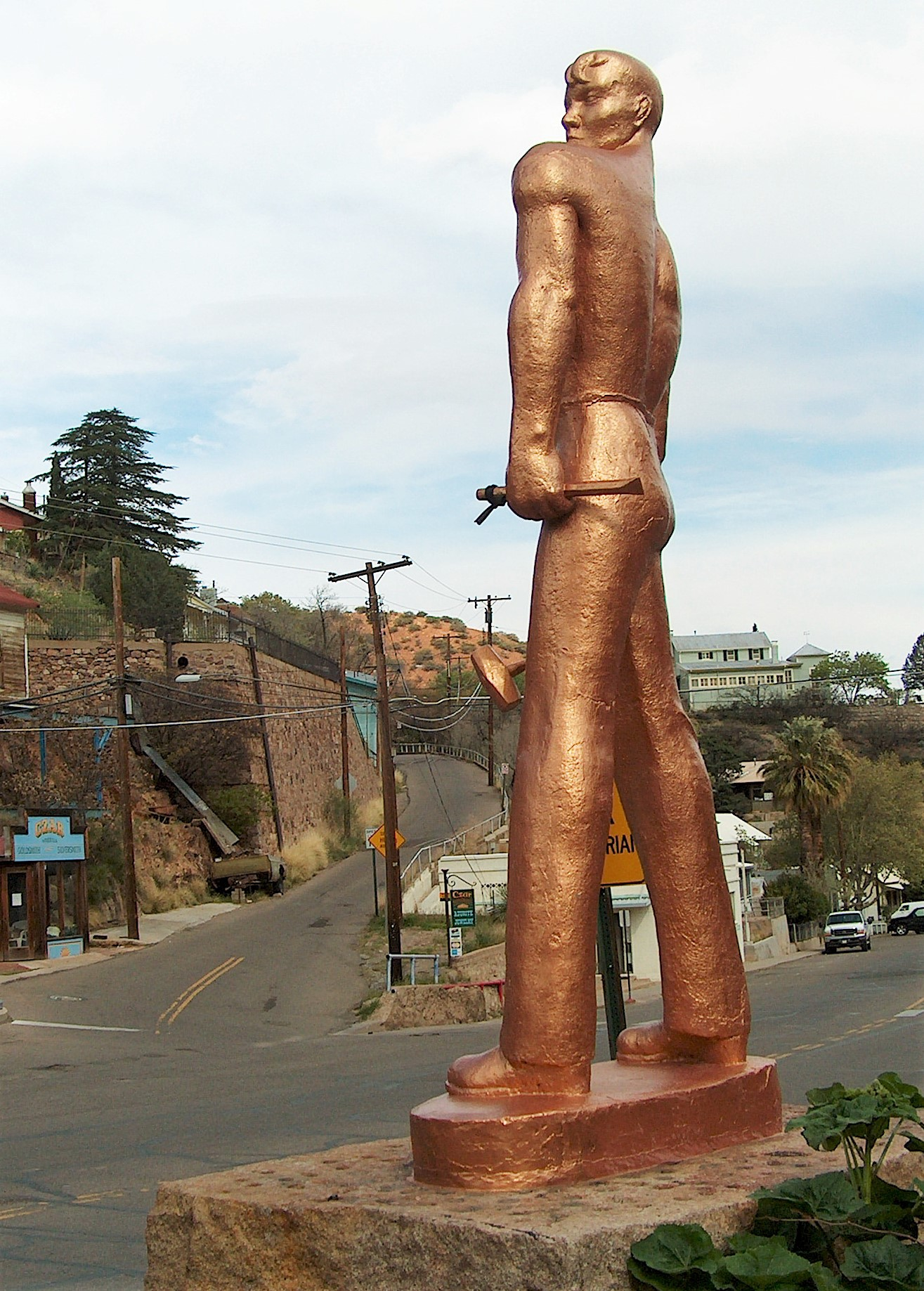
Copper Man statue

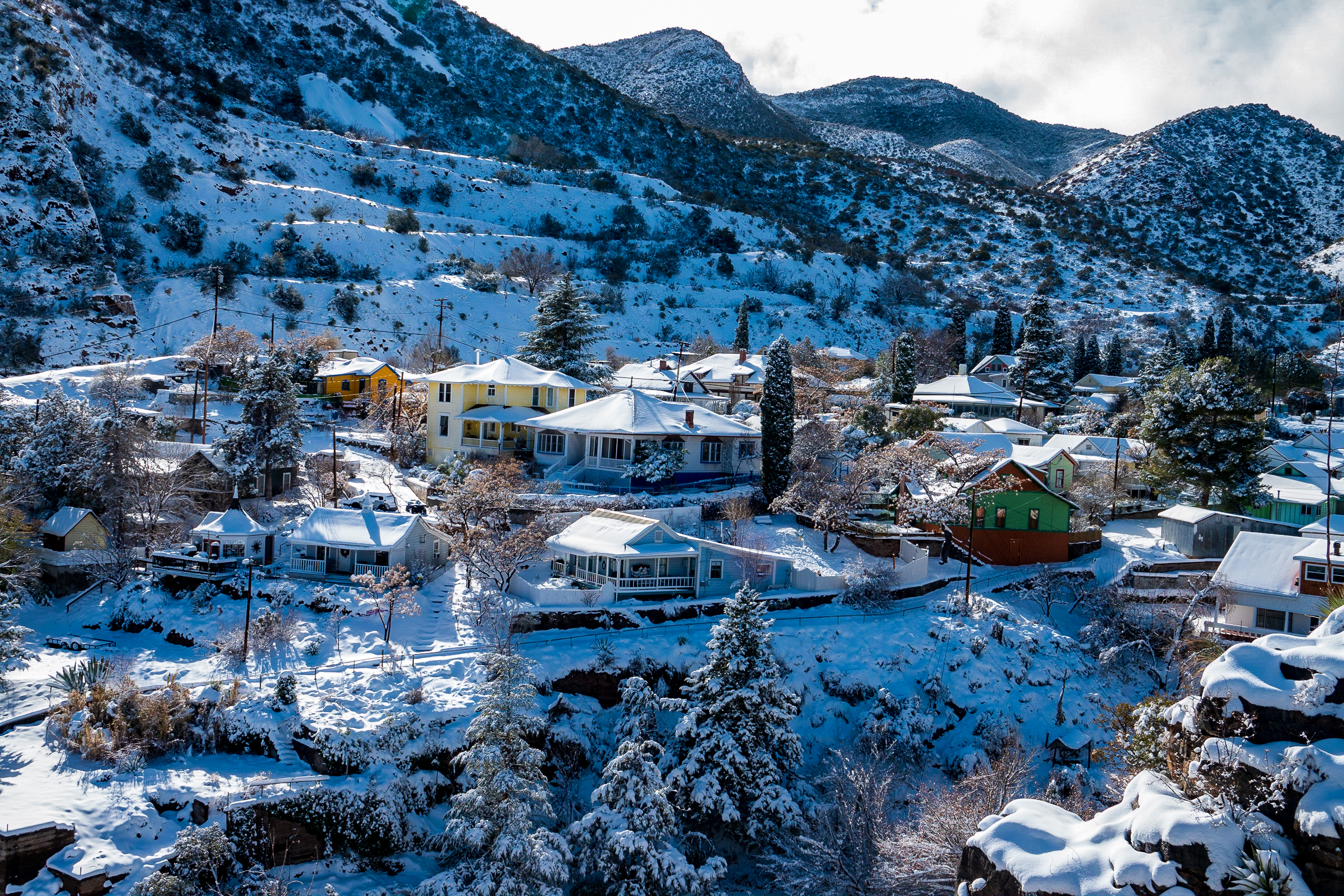
A view of Bisbee, Arizona after a heavy snowfall in February 2021

== Sports ==
In 1908 Bisbee joined with the town of Clifton to form a cricket team that travelled to Santa Monica, California to play the Santa Monica Cricket Club in two games overlooking the Pacific Ocean on the grounds of the Polo Field. The team lost both cricket games. The Copper Echo reported that Bennie, the general manager of the Shannon Company Copper Mine, was the team's best cricketer.

Bisbee was home to a minor league baseball franchise from 1928 until 1941. The Bisbee Bees played as members of the Arizona State League and Arizona-Texas League.

== Government ==
Bisbee is governed via the mayor-council system. The city council consists of six members who are elected from three wards, each ward elects two members. The mayor is elected in a direct citywide vote.

In 2013, the city council received public notoriety when it proposed same-sex civil unions and shortly after became the first municipality in Arizona to pass a civil union law. The state's Attorney General, Tom Horne, threatened to sue, but decided against it after Bisbee amended the ordinance; the civil union ordinance came into effect July 5, 2013. "Bisbee was the first in Arizona to approve civil unions, with Tucson, Jerome and Clarkdale following."

== Infrastructure ==
=== Transportation ===
The Bisbee Bus System, which is operated by the city of Douglas under contract, has regularly scheduled services from Monday through Saturday within Bisbee and to Naco; one-way fare is $1; The city of Douglas also operates the Cochise Connection, with regular shuttle services between Douglas, Bisbee, and Sierra Vista; one-way fare is $3–4.

== Notable people ==
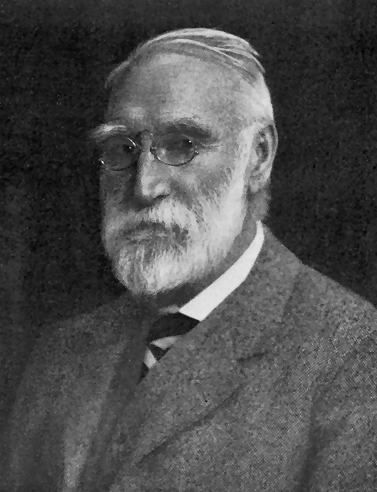
Dr. James Douglas, 1910

- Buster Adams, professional baseball player
- Betty Bays (1931–1992), All-American Girls Professional Baseball League
- Ben Chase, NFL player
- Gib Dawson, NFL player
- James Douglas, Canadian metallurgist and founder of the Copper Queen Mine
- Lewis Williams Douglas (1894–1974), politician, businessman diplomat and academic
- M. J. Frankovich, UCLA quarterback, movie producer (The Shootist, Cactus Flower)
- Jess Hartley, author, blogger and game designer for White Wolf Games
- Earl Hindman (1942–2003), actor, known for portraying Wilson on the 1991 sitcom Home Improvement
- J. A. Jance, author
- Jake LaMotta ("The Raging Bull"), former middleweight prizefighting champion
- Clarence Maddern, professional baseball player ca. 1946–1951
- James F. McNulty Jr. (1925–2009), member of the U.S. House of Representatives
- William Milam, diplomat and former US Ambassador to Pakistan and Bangladesh
- Paul Newman, corporation commissioner, former state representative, former Cochise County supervisor
- Alice Notley, poet
- Richard Shelton, author
- William P. Sims, Arizona state senator
- Doug Stanhope, comedian and writer
- Betsy Thornton, writer
- Dawson Trotman, (1906–1956) Founder of The Navigators Born in Bisbee
- Ken Westerfield, disc sports (Frisbee) pioneer, hall of fame, showman, promoter
- Jack Williamson, science-fiction writer, born 1908, in Bisbee
- Peter Young, artist

== In popular culture ==
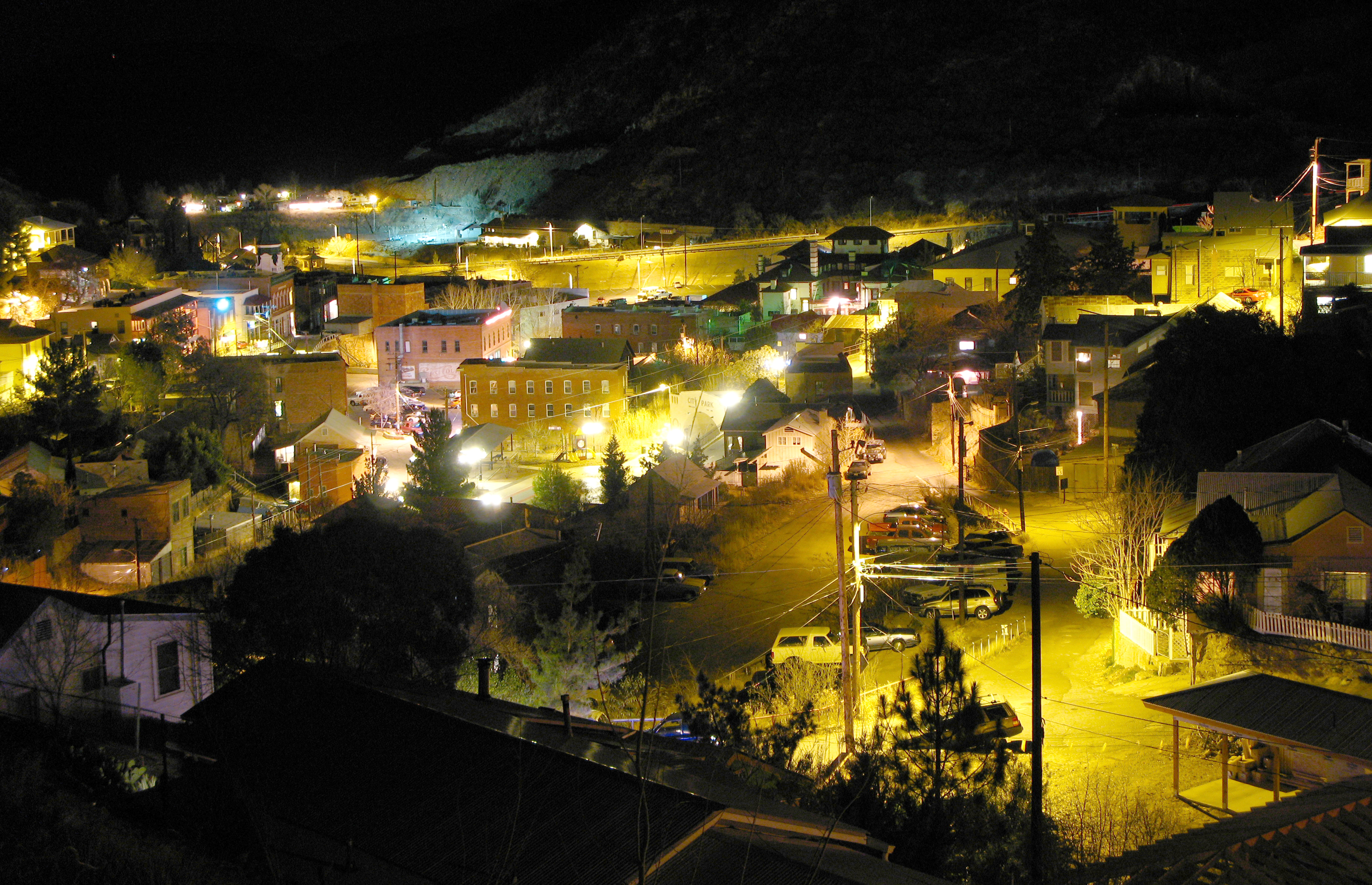
Historic Old Bisbee at night, 2008

=== Film and television ===
- The 2018 documentary Bisbee '17 chronicled the Bisbee Deportation on the 100th anniversary of the incident.
- Violent Saturday (1955) was filmed in Bisbee
- In L.A. Confidential (1997), Lynn Bracken (portrayed by Kim Basinger) is from Bisbee, as revealed by the hand-embroidered cushion in her bedroom.
- In 3:10 to Yuma (1957 film), the Wade Gang stop at a saloon in Bisbee after robbing the stagecoach and are pursued from the town.
- In episode six of the first season of Supernatural, Dean Winchester lies about being a detective in Bisbee as a cover.
- In Curb Your Enthusiasm, the biological parents of the fictional version of Larry David are from Bisbee.

=== Novels ===
- J. A. Jance's Joanna Brady novels are often set in Bisbee.

=== Video game ===
- The fictional town of Paradise, Arizona from the 2003 video game Postal 2 is based on Bisbee.

== See also ==
- Lavender Pit
- Phelps-Dodge Corporation
- Arizona Cactus Botanical Garden
- Bisbee-Douglas International Airport
- Bisbee Riot
- List of historic properties in Bisbee, Arizona
- Southeastern Arizona Bird Observatory
- USS Bisbee
- Warren–Bisbee Railway
