= Southeastern Arizona Bird Observatory =

US nonprofit organization

- Southeastern Arizona Bird Observatory Incorporated
- Abbreviation: SABO
- Formation: 1996; 30 years ago
- Founder: Tom Wood; Sheri Williamson
- Type: Nonprofit
- Tax ID no.: 86-0842671
- Headquarters: Bisbee, Arizona
- Website: sabo.org

The Southeastern Arizona Bird Observatory (SABO) is a nonprofit membership-supported scientific and educational organization founded in 1996 in Bisbee, Arizona, US. The mission of the Southeastern Arizona Bird Observatory is to promote the conservation of the birds of southeastern Arizona, their habitats, and the diversity of species that share those habitats through research, monitoring, and public education. The observatory's founders are Tom Wood and Sheri Williamson, former managers of The Nature Conservancy's Ramsey Canyon Preserve.

== Monitoring bird diversity ==
Southeastern Arizona is at a biogeographic crossroads, where the Rocky Mountains meet the Sierra Madre Occidental of Mexico and the Chihuahuan Desert blends into the Sonoran Desert. Isolated mountain ranges known as "sky islands" are home to a variety of animal and plant species found nowhere else in the United States. The San Pedro River flows north from the mountains of northern Sonora, Mexico, providing a highway for millions of migrating birds every spring and fall. The Santa Cruz River and Sonoita Creek also provide riparian habitat for breeding and migrating birds and other wildlife. Much of the best remaining wildlife habitat in the region is in the Coronado National Forest, national and state parks, national wildlife refuges and conservation areas, state wildlife areas, military reservations, and Nature Conservancy preserves.

The Southeastern Arizona Bird Observatory has conducted various monitoring projects both independently and in cooperation with public agencies. Its longest-running research project, in cooperation with the United States Bureau of Land Management and Friends of the San Pedro River, is a study of the hummingbirds that use the San Pedro River as a migratory corridor or breeding area. Banding sessions are open to the public, which has allowed thousands of visitors to observe research in progress and learn more about hummingbirds, other migratory birds, the ecological significance of the San Pedro River, and other conservation issues. Past projects include migration monitoring and breeding bird monitoring under the MAPS (Monitoring Avian Productivity and Survivorship) Program for the National Park Service and Fish and Wildlife Service. SABO is a past participant in the Landbird Monitoring Network of the Americas.

== Ecotourism and outreach ==
Southeastern Arizona consistently ranks as one of the top five birding locations in the United States. Tens of thousands of birders visit the area each year, making nature-based tourism an important asset to the regional economy. The area's natural attractions also lure active retirees and others interested in relocating to areas with diverse opportunities for outdoor recreation. To cultivate environmental awareness and advocacy among both residents and tourists, the Southeastern Arizona Bird Observatory offers bird walks, workshops, other educational activities in both Arizona and northwestern Mexico, and volunteer opportunities.

In November 2020, SABO assumed ownership and management of Ash Canyon Bird Sanctuary, on the southeastern slope of the Huachuca Mountains in Sierra Vista Southeast in southwestern Cochise County, Arizona. Purchase of the property, former home of the late Mary Jo Ballator, was accomplished through a single donation. The site is managed by SABO staff and volunteers; operations are funded through memberships and site-specific donations. The sanctuary is best known for its pollinator gardens and bird feeding stations, which are open to the public. The property lies in the transition zone (ecotone) between desert grassland and Madrean pine–oak woodlands and includes portions of a ciénega, a rare wetland type unique to the arid regions of the southwestern United States and northern Mexico. Over 200 species of birds have been recorded at the site, including lucifer sheartail, plain-capped starthroat, elegant trogon, Montezuma quail, and rufous-winged sparrow. Sightings contributed to iNaturalist have recorded over 240 non-bird species, including over 180 species of arthropods.

The Southeastern Arizona Bird Observatory also supports community-based outreach and economic development programs such as the Southwest Wings Birding and Nature Festival, the Wings Over Willcox Sandhill Crane Celebration, and the Southeastern Arizona Birding Trail.
