= Warren–Bisbee Railway =

Former electric interurban railway in Cochise County, Arizona

The Warren–Bisbee Railway was an 8-mile electric interurban railway in the U.S. state of Arizona, linking Warren with Bisbee. The line began service with the inaugural run on March 12, 1908, operating a 30-minute service with 42-foot McGuire-Cummings interurban cars. The line used between Bisbee and Warren a private right-of-way (i.e. no street trackage) with grades up to 7%; in addition to the main line, a 4-mile "High Line" extended from Warren to serve several of the area's copper mines. In 1909 and 1910, the line was extended at existing streets of Bisbee to "Warren & Tombstone Canyon" and bringing the track mileage to 8.05.

From November 1, 1909, until at least 1919, mail was carried on the electric line, in closed pouches, between Bisbee and Warren via Lowell Station, a distance of just over 4 miles, several times a day.

A decline in copper mining and the proliferation of the automobile reduced traffic, leading to several years of operating losses and abandonment in 1928. The last run was on May 31, 1928.
