= Butterfield Overland Mail in New Mexico Territory =

American West stagecoach route

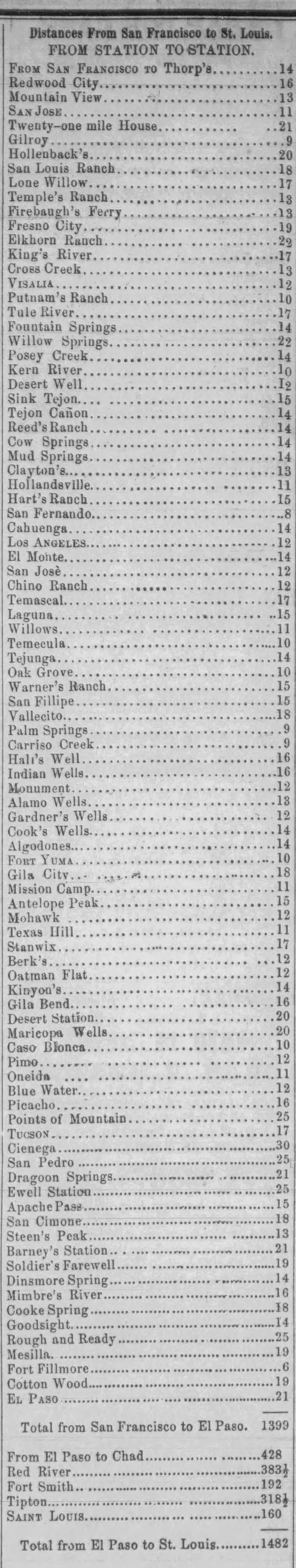
Overland stage travel from California to Texas in 1860 - "Distances from San Francisco to St. Louis from Station to Station" (Los Angeles Daily News, August 31, 1860)

The Butterfield Overland Mail was a transport and mail delivery system that employed stagecoaches that travelled on a specific route between St. Louis, Missouri and San Francisco, California and which passed through the New Mexico Territory. It was created by the United States Congress on March 3, 1857, and operated until March 30, 1861. The route that was operated extended from where the ferry across the Colorado River to Fort Yuma Station, California was located, through New Mexico Territory via Tucson to the Rio Grande and Mesilla, New Mexico then south to Franklin, Texas, midpoint on the route. The New Mexico Territory mail route was divided into two divisions each under a superintendent. Tucson was the headquarters of the 3rd Division of the Butterfield Overland Mail Company. Franklin Station in the town of Franklin, (now El Paso, Texas), was the headquarters of the 4th Division.

== Stations ==
List of stations within two divisions:

=== 3rd Division ===
- Swiveler's Station – Located 20 miles east of Fort Yuma. Subsequently, the post office for nearby Gila City 1.5 miles west of the station.
  - Mission Camp – a later station located 11.49 miles east of Gila City.
- Filibusters Camp – Located 18 miles from Swiveler's Station.
  - Antelope Peak Station, a later station located 15.14 miles east of Mission Camp, at the foot of Antelope Peak. It replaced Filibusters Camp Station, 6 miles to the west.
- Peterman's Station – Located 19 miles from Filibuster Camp, 12.8 miles from Antelope Hill. Later called Mohawk Station.
  - Texas Hill Station, a later station located 10.98 miles east of Mohawk Station, replaced Grizwell's Station.
- Griswell's Station – Located 12 miles from Peterman's Station, later abandoned.
- Flap-Jack Ranch – Located 15 miles from Griswell's Station, later called Grinnel's Ranch or Station, located 27.11 miles from Mohawk Station, 16.13 miles from Texas Hill Station, sometimes called Stanwix Ranch and Stanwix Station by Union Army reports.
  - Burke's Station, a later station 9.43 miles from Grinnel's Ranch midway to Oatman Flat Station.
- Oatman Flat Station – Located 20 miles from Flap-Jack Ranch.
- Murderer's Grave Station – Located 20 miles from Oatmans Flat Station, later Kinyon's Station.
- Gila Ranch – Located 17 miles from Murderer's Grave Station.
  - South Tank or Pima Pass Tank – Later water tank, located 10 miles from Gila Ranch.
  - Desert Station – Later station located 21.82 miles from Gila Ranch, 11.82 miles from Pima Pass Tank.
  - North Tank or Montezuma Head Tank – Later water tank, located 8.57 miles from Desert Station.
- Maricopa Wells Station – Located 40 miles from Gila Ranch, and 18.57 miles from Desert Station, 10 miles from Montezuma Head Tank.
  - Casa Blanca Station – Station established in the latter part of 1858, located 11.35 miles from Maricopa Wells.
- Socatoon Station – Located 22 miles from Maricopa Wells and 11 miles from Casa Blanca Station.
  - Oneida Station – Later station, located 13 miles from Socatoon Station.
  - Blue Water Station – Later station located 11 miles from Oneida Station.
- Pechacho or Picacho Station – Located 37 miles from Socatoon Station, 14 miles from Blue Water.
- Pointer Mountain Station – Located 22 miles from Picacho Station.
- Tucson Station – Located 18 miles from Pointer Mountain. Headquarters of the 3rd Division.

=== 4th Division ===
- Seneca Spring Station – Located 35 miles from Tucson, no water on the route except at station. Later known as Cienega Spring Station.
- San Pedro Station – Located in Arizona, 24 miles from Seneca Springs, no water on the route except at the station.
- Dragoon Springs Station – Located in Arizona, 23 miles from San Pedro Station, no water except at station.
  - Ewell Station, a later station located in Arizona, 25 miles east of Dragoon Springs and 15 miles west of Apache Pass.
- Apache Pass Station – Located in Arizona, 49 miles from Dragoon Springs, no water except at station.
  - San Simon Station, a later station located in Arizona, 19 miles east of Apache Pass Station.
- Stein's Peak Station – Located in Doubtful Canyon, New Mexico, 35 miles from Apache Pass, no water except at station.
  - Mexican Springs Station, a later station located in New Mexico, between Steins Peak and Soldiers Farewell stations.
- Soldiers Farewell Station – Located in New Mexico, 42 miles from Stein's Peak Station, no water except at station.
- Ojo de Vaca Station – Located in New Mexico, 14 miles from Soldiers Farewell Station.
- Miembre's River Station – Located in New Mexico, 16 miles from Ojo de Vaca. Later Mowry City, New Mexico.
- Cooke's Spring Station – Located in New Mexico, 18 miles from the Miembre's River Station, just west of the site of the later Fort Cummings.
  - Goodsight Station, later station, located in New Mexico, 14 miles east of the Cooke's Spring Station.
  - Rough and Ready Station, later station, located in New Mexico, 22 miles east of Goodsight Station.
- Picacho Station – Located in the village of Picacho, 15 miles east of the Rough and Ready Station and 52 miles from Cooke's Springs. This station had the last natural water available on the route until Cooke's Springs, although the later intervening stations had hauled water and constructed earthen tanks to catch rainwater.
- Mesilla – Located 6 miles, east of Picacho Station. Mesilla was almost exactly midway between St. Louis, Missouri and San Francisco, California and was the most important Overland Stage Station between the two points. At this time Mesilla was on the west bank of the Rio Grande and was the point where the route crossed the river.
- Fort Fillmore Station – Located on the east bank of the Rio Grande, 14 miles from Picacho Station, nearby Fort Fillmore.
- Cottonwoods Station – Located, 25 miles south of Fort Filmore along the east bank of the Rio Grande, just over the border in what is now Vinton, Texas.
- Franklin Station – Located in the town of Franklin, (now El Paso, Texas), 22 miles from Cottonwoods Station. Headquarters of the 4th Division.

=== 5th Division ===
5th Division Stations in New Mexico Territory. These were located on Captain Pope's New Road to Franklin (1st route used, until August 1, 1859, when the route was moved to the Lower Road.)

- Ojos de los Alamos Station – A later station in New Mexico Territory, located 20 miles northeast of Hueco Tanks Station in Texas.
- Cornudas de Los Alamos Station – An original station in New Mexico Territory. Located 36 miles east of Hueco Tanks, 16 miles east of Ojos de los Alamos Station. Located 28 miles northwest of Crow Springs Station in Texas, a later relay station midway between Cornudas and Pinery Station.

== See also ==
- Butterfield Overland Mail in California
  - Butterfield Overland Mail in Baja California
- Butterfield Overland Mail in Texas
- Butterfield Overland Mail in Indian Territory
- Butterfield Overland Mail in Arkansas and Missouri
- Apache Pass
- Bascom Affair
