= Burro Cienega =

Stream in New Mexico

Burro Cienega is a stream that arises at an elevation of 5990 feet, at 32°28′48″N 108°27′05″W, in the Big Burro Mountains in Grant County, New Mexico. Its mouth is at 4196 feet at a playa about 5.5 miles southeast of Lordsburg in Hidalgo County, New Mexico.

== History ==
Ojo Ynez, a spring, and watering place on the old road from Janos, Chihuahua, to the Santa Rita copper mines was located in the valley of the Burro Cienega two miles upstream from where the road crossed the stream just northeast of Soldiers Farewell Hill. It was subsequently a watering place on Cooke's Wagon Road and the route of the San Antonio–San Diego Mail Line, 10 miles southwest of Ojo de Vaca (Cow Spring) and 2 miles northeast of the later Soldier's Farewell Stage Station on the route of the Butterfield Overland Mail.

== See also ==
- List of rivers of New Mexico
