= Soldier's Farewell =

Soldier's Farewell may refer to:

- A Soldier's Farewell, an episode of the British television sitcom Dad's Army
- Soldiers Farewell Hill, a summit in Grand County, New Mexico
- Soldier's Farewell Stage Station, a stagecoach stop in New Mexico
