= Apache Pass =

Landform in Cochise County, Arizona

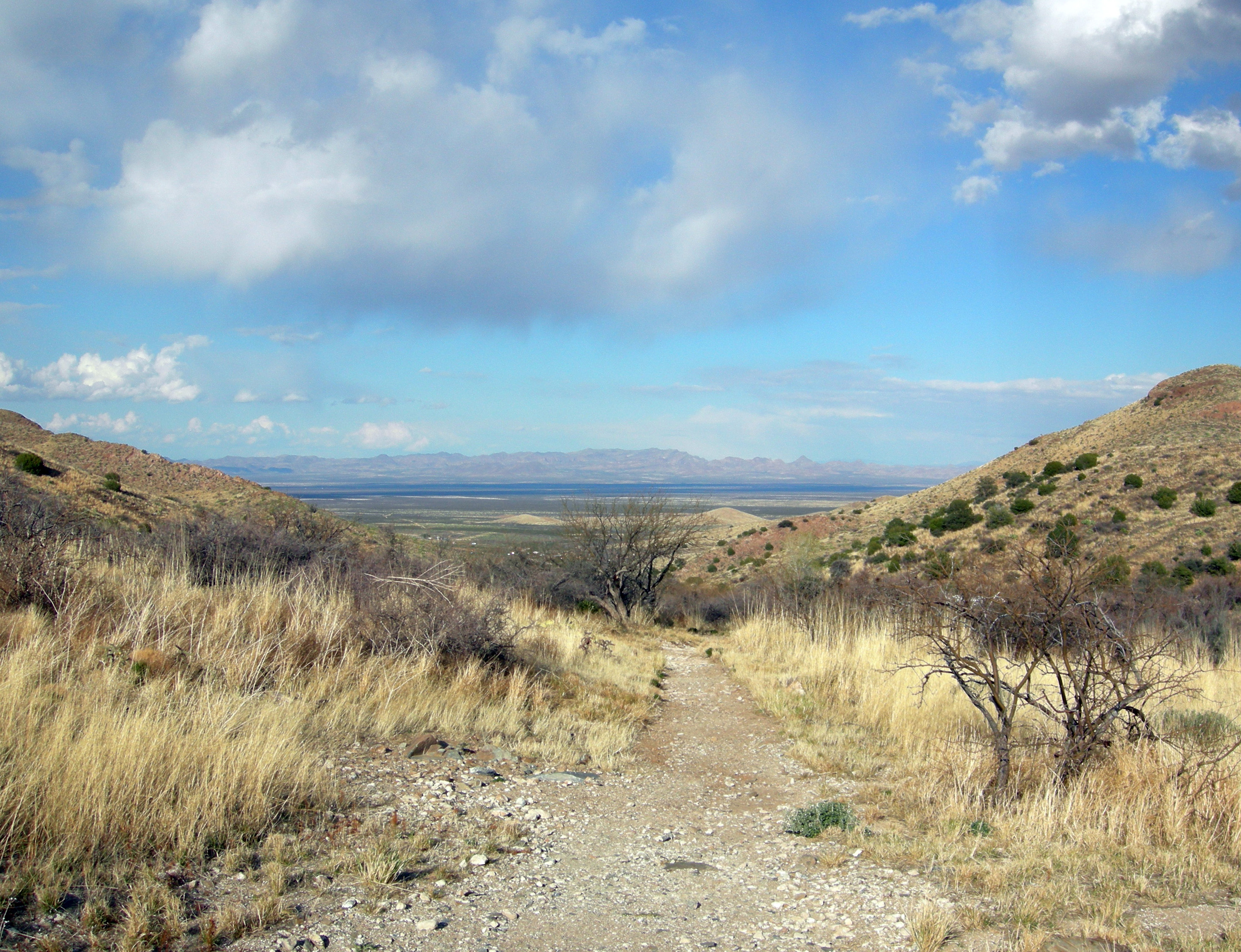
- Apache Pass viewed from Fort Bowie, facing north.
- Interactive map of Apache Pass
- Elevation: 5,110 ft (1,560 m)
- Traversed by: Apache Pass Road

Third Approach
- Location: Cochise County, Arizona, United States
- Coordinates: 32°09′06″N 109°28′54″W

Apache Pass, also known by its earlier Spanish name Puerto del Dado ("Pass of the Die"), is a historic mountain pass in the U.S. state of Arizona between the Dos Cabezas Mountains and Chiricahua Mountains at an elevation of 5,110 feet (1,560 m). It is approximately 20 miles (32 km) east-southeast of Willcox, Arizona, in Cochise County.

== Apache Spring ==
A natural freshwater spring, Apache Spring, emerges from a geological fault line running through the pass. The history of Apache Pass begins with this spring – as the only reliable water source for many miles, the spring served as a critical resupply point for early travelers through the area. Indigenous peoples and westward migrants alike depended on the spring. For the local Apache people, the spring at Apache Pass became a sort of crossroads, with many trails from different directions converging on the site. The great Chiricahua Apache leader Cochise, along with many of his followers, favored the area as a camping spot in winter and spring. There were often hundreds of Chiricahuas living nearby. A little higher than the surrounding desert terrain, the pass was cooler on hot days, and the area around the spring provided abundant game and firewood.

== Puerto del Dado ==
After Spanish and Mexican settlers began visiting the area, the spring at Apache Pass quickly became a flash point for conflict with the resident Apache tribes, leading to its original Spanish name Puerto del Dado, the "Door (or Pass) of the Die", meaning "pass of chance", which compared the risky nature of crossing the pass to a game of chance, like one played by soldiers with dice.

In the 1830s, some American fur trappers are believed to have traveled through Apache Pass. In 1846, Philip St. George Cooke, leading the Mormon Battalion that was surveying and constructing what became Cooke's Wagon Road, bypassed the area, despite Cooke's awareness of its existence from his guides, because details of the route through the pass, including its extent and the availability of other nearby water sources, were unknown, in contrast to the longer route to the south that was eventually chosen. It subsequently fell to a party of Forty-Niners led by John Coffee Hays to pioneer a shorter route between Mesilla and Tucson, called the Tucson Cutoff, that took advantage of the pass. Hays followed the guidance of Mexican soldiers he encountered at Ojo Ynez on the Burro Cienega in New Mexico. The cutoff emerged as part of the Southern Emigrant Trail, which became the major southern route of east-west travel for wagons and stagecoaches until the coming of the railroads.

== Apache Pass Station ==
In 1858, the Butterfield Overland Mail Company began stagecoach service between Saint Louis, Missouri and San Francisco, California using a bow-shaped route down through Texas and the New Mexico Territory and on into southern California. They built a way station out of stone on the eastern side of Apache Pass, where they could rest their horses and utilize the water from the spring. It and the station at Dragoon Springs, Arizona were made from such durable material, an acknowledgement of the danger they felt from the local Apaches.

Apache Pass Station (32°8′56″N 109°26′58″W) was originally 35 miles west of Stein's Peak Station in Doubtful Canyon and 49 miles east of Dragoon Springs Station, with no water along the route except at these three stations. Later in 1858, two new stations were built between these older stations, so that Apache Pass Station was located 19 miles west of San Simon Station on the San Simon River and 15 miles from Ewell Station, which shortened the route between Apache Pass and Dragoon Springs, and provided water on both sections. It is likely that Cochise's band provided the stage travelers with firewood when he was in the area.

== Bascom Affair ==
The construction of the stage station and the increasing use of the pass by white settlers set the stage for an incident often considered the starting point of Cochise's eleven-year war against the United States, and which was a formative element in the much longer struggle between Apache peoples and American settlers even after Cochise made his own peace. In February 1861, a detachment of federal troops under Lt. George N. Bascom made camp in Apache Pass, near the spring and the stage station, hoping to negotiate with Cochise and his Chiricahua Apaches for the return of a kidnapped child. When Cochise agreed to meet near the camp, Bascom attempted to arrest him and several other Apaches; the resulting stand-off, lasting several days, ended with the deaths of hostages on both sides. The affront sparked a war between Cochise and the Americans that included the Battle of Apache Pass in 1862, and which only ended eleven years later with a treaty facilitated by General Oliver O. Howard and a white teamster and friend of Cochise's named Tom Jeffords. Still, the residual anger of other Apache tribes continued for many years in the Apache Wars, a direct result of Bascom's rash actions.

== Fort Bowie ==
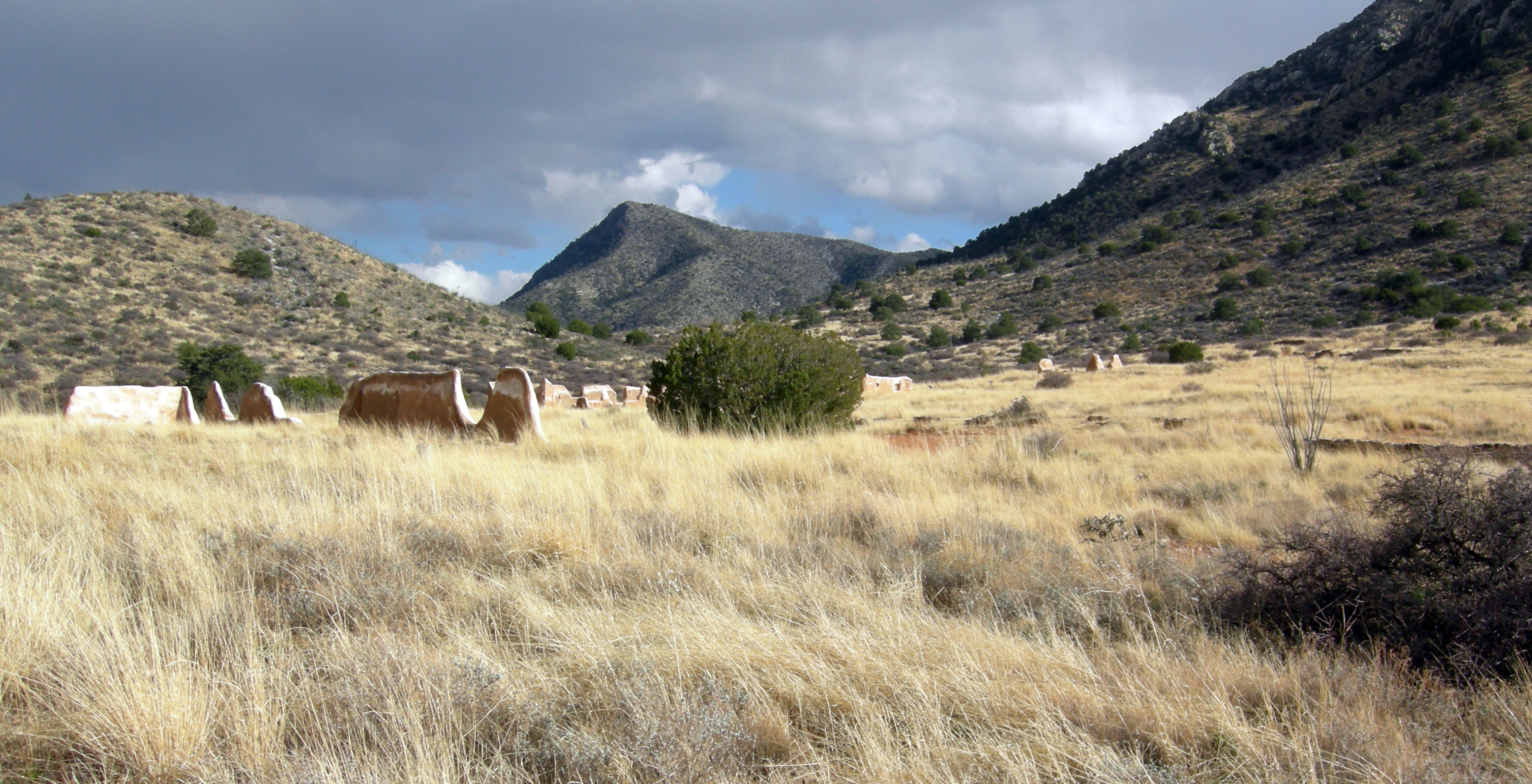
Fort Bowie site near Apache Pass.

After the Battle of Apache Pass in July 1862, a United States military post, Fort Bowie, was built to protect the pass and the spring. First, a rudimentary post was constructed near the spring, then later, a more permanent post was constructed a little higher on nearby table-land. Ultimately, Fort Bowie became the headquarters for the fight against the Chiricahua Apaches. When Cochise and General Howard finally made peace, the resulting treaty provided for a large reservation to be set aside encompassing most of what is now Cochise County, Arizona, and centered around Apache Pass, with the Indian agency adjacent to Fort Bowie. The Chiricahua reservation lasted about 4 years; with Cochise's death in 1874 and the dearth of leadership that followed, tensions (and possibly depredations) increased and the Chiricahuas were moved north to the San Carlos Apache Indian Reservation and consolidated there under Agent John Clum so that they could be better managed.

Apache Pass continued to play a major role in frontier history until after the final surrender of Geronimo and his band of renegades in September 1886. In the early 1890s, with the close of the Apache Wars, Fort Bowie was decommissioned and abandoned. Travelers now bypassed the area on the railroad, built a few miles to the north. The only thing left behind at Apache Pass after the local ranchers scavenged the ruins for building materials were a few adobe walls, bleaching white in the sun and slowly washing away in the infrequent rains, and the memories of those who had lived through their experiences there.

== Apache Pass today ==
Apache Pass is now located within Fort Bowie National Historic Site, managed and interpreted by the National Park Service, and, along with the surrounding peaks, stands like a mute guard over its unique history. The few remaining building walls in the area have been "stabilized" for preservation purposes, but will not be restored. Visitors who hike along the trails and drive along Apache Pass Road can see the remains of the Butterfield stage station (consisting of the stone foundation), the ruins of the Chiricahua Reservation's agency building, a cemetery, and the remnants of the two forts that were constructed there. The route of the stage trail can still be seen, as well as the sites near the top of the pass where Lt. Bascom executed his Apache hostages and Cochise's followers burned his. Apache Spring still flows, although it has become a mere trickle relative to its former volume. Today's calm and quiet there belies the bustle and excitement that was characteristic of the spot from the 1860s to the 1890s.

== See also ==
- Butterfield Overland Mail in New Mexico Territory
- Gleeson Gunfight
