= Soldiers Farewell Hill =

Mountain in New Mexico, United States

Soldiers Farewell Hill, a summit at an elevation of 6135 feet, in the Big Burro Mountains, in Grant County, New Mexico.

== History ==
Soldiers Farewell Hill lies south of the Burro Cienega. It marked the site of Ojo Ynez, a watering place nearby the old road between Janos, Chihuahua and the Santa Rita copper mines, later used by Cooke's Wagon Road and the San Antonio-San Diego Mail Line. This summit lies over 2 miles east of the site of the Soldier's Farewell Stage Station of the Butterfield Overland Mail.

An apocryphal explanation of the romantic name (and the most widely accepted) is that soldiers escorting wagon trains en route to California were ordered to go no further than this location, where they bid the travelers, "Farewell."
