= Pacific Railroad =

Railway line in Missouri, United States

Overview
- Locale: Missouri
- Dates of operation: 1849–1872
- Successor: Missouri Pacific Railroad, St. Louis-San Francisco Railway

Technical
- Track gauge: 4 ft 8 1/2 in (1,435 mm) standard gauge

The Pacific Railroad (not to be confused with Union Pacific Railroad) was a railroad based in Missouri. It was a predecessor of both the Missouri Pacific Railroad and St. Louis-San Francisco Railway. Chartered by Missouri in 1849 to extend "from St. Louis to the western boundary of Missouri and thence to the Pacific Ocean" Due to a cholera epidemic in St. Louis in 1849 and other delays, groundbreaking did not occur until July 4, 1851. The railroad purchased its first steam locomotive from a manufacturer in Taunton, Massachusetts; it arrived at St. Louis by river in August 1852. On December 9, 1852, the Pacific Railroad had its inaugural run, traveling from its depot on Fourteenth Street, along the Mill Creek Valley, to Cheltenham in about ten minutes. By the following May, it had reached Kirkwood; within months tunnels west of Kirkwood were completed, allowing the line to reach Franklin.

The Southwest Branch of the Pacific Railroad was authorized in 1852 and split off at Franklin (renamed Pacific, Missouri, in 1859), as the Southwest Pacific Railroad (later the main line of the St. Louis-San Francisco Railway) in 1866.

Financial difficulties meant that Pacific Railroad did not reach Washington, eighteen miles away, until February 1855. On November 1, 1855, an excursion train carrying 600 passengers from St. Louis to celebrate the opening of the railroad to Jefferson City crashed through a temporary bridge over the Gasconade River, killing at least 30. This became known as the Gasconade Bridge train disaster. Later that year, the line reached Jefferson City, the state capital.

By July 1858 the Pacific Railroad reached Tipton, the eastern terminus for the Butterfield Overland Mail, an overland mail service to San Francisco. The combined rail/coach service reduced mail delivery times between St. Louis and San Francisco from about 35 days to less than 25 days.

In 1865, it became the first railroad to serve Kansas City, after construction was interrupted by the American Civil War. In 1872, the Pacific Railroad was reorganized as the Missouri Pacific Railroad by new investors after a railroad debt crisis.

== See also ==
- List of defunct Kansas railroads
- List of defunct Missouri railroads
- Butterfield Overland Mail in California
- Butterfield Overland Mail in New Mexico Territory
- Butterfield Overland Mail in Texas
- Butterfield Overland Mail in Indian Territory
- Butterfield Overland Mail in Arkansas and Missouri
