= Ewell Station =

Butterfield Overland Mail stagecoach stop in Arizona

Coordinates: 32°07′36.13″N 109°39′0.38″W

Ewell Station is a later station of the Butterfield Overland Mail located 24.4 miles (39.3 km) east of Dragoon Springs, Arizona and 12.22 miles (19.67 km) west of Apache Pass Station. This station shortened the route between Dragoon Springs and Apache Pass Stations and provided a water stop not previously available. The station was probably started in late 1858 (168 years ago) as it is not listed in Oct., 1858 but appears in an account from 1862, after Butterfield had ceased operation. Water at the station was hauled from a spring, located 4 miles (6.4 km) north of the station in the Dos Cabezas Mountains and stored in a cistern.
