= Stein's Peak Station =

Butterfield Overland Mail stagecoach stop in New Mexico

Coordinates: 32°20′17″N 109°1′48″W

Stein's Peak Station, was one of the original stage stations of the Butterfield Overland Mail. Its ruins are still to be seen in Doubtful Canyon, at an elevation of 4652 feet, northeast of Stein's Peak in Hidalgo County, New Mexico. Stein's Peak Station, was 35 miles (56 km) east of Apache Pass Station and 42 miles (68 km) west of Soldier's Farewell Stage Station. Later stations were located midway between these stations to provide water and changes of horse teams in the hot, arid climate. These were San Simon Station to the west and Mexican Springs Station to the east of Lordsburg, New Mexico.
