= Butterfield Overland Mail in Arkansas and Missouri =

Former mail route through Arkansas and Missouri, U.S.

The Butterfield Overland Mail in Arkansas and Missouri was created by the United States Congress on March 3, 1857, and operated until March 30, 1861. The route that was operated extended from San Francisco, California to Los Angeles, then across the Colorado Desert to Fort Yuma, then across New Mexico Territory via, Tucson and Mesilla, New Mexico to Franklin, Texas, midpoint on the route. The route then crossed Texas to the Red River and into Indian Territory to enter Arkansas at Fort Smith. Fort Smith was terminal where the secondary route that crossed Arkansas and across the Mississippi River to Memphis, Tennessee, met the main route that led northeast to Tipton with the final leg by train via the Pacific Railroad to St. Louis. The Arkansas and Missouri mail route was one division, the 8th under a superintendent.

== Stations ==
=== 8th Division ===
- Fort Smith

==== Fort Smith to Memphis Route ====
- Charleston, Arkansas
- Paris, Arkansas
- Stinnett's Station
- Dardanelle, Arkansas
- Norristown (Russellville, Arkansas)
- Pottsville Inn
- Hurricane Station
- Lewisburg (near present-day Morrilton, Arkansas)
- Plumer's Station (Plumerville, Arkansas)
- Cadron Station
- Atlanta (present-day Austin, Arkansas)
- Des Arc
- Madison, Arkansas
- Memphis, Tennessee

==== Main 8th Division Route ====
===== Arkansas Stations =====
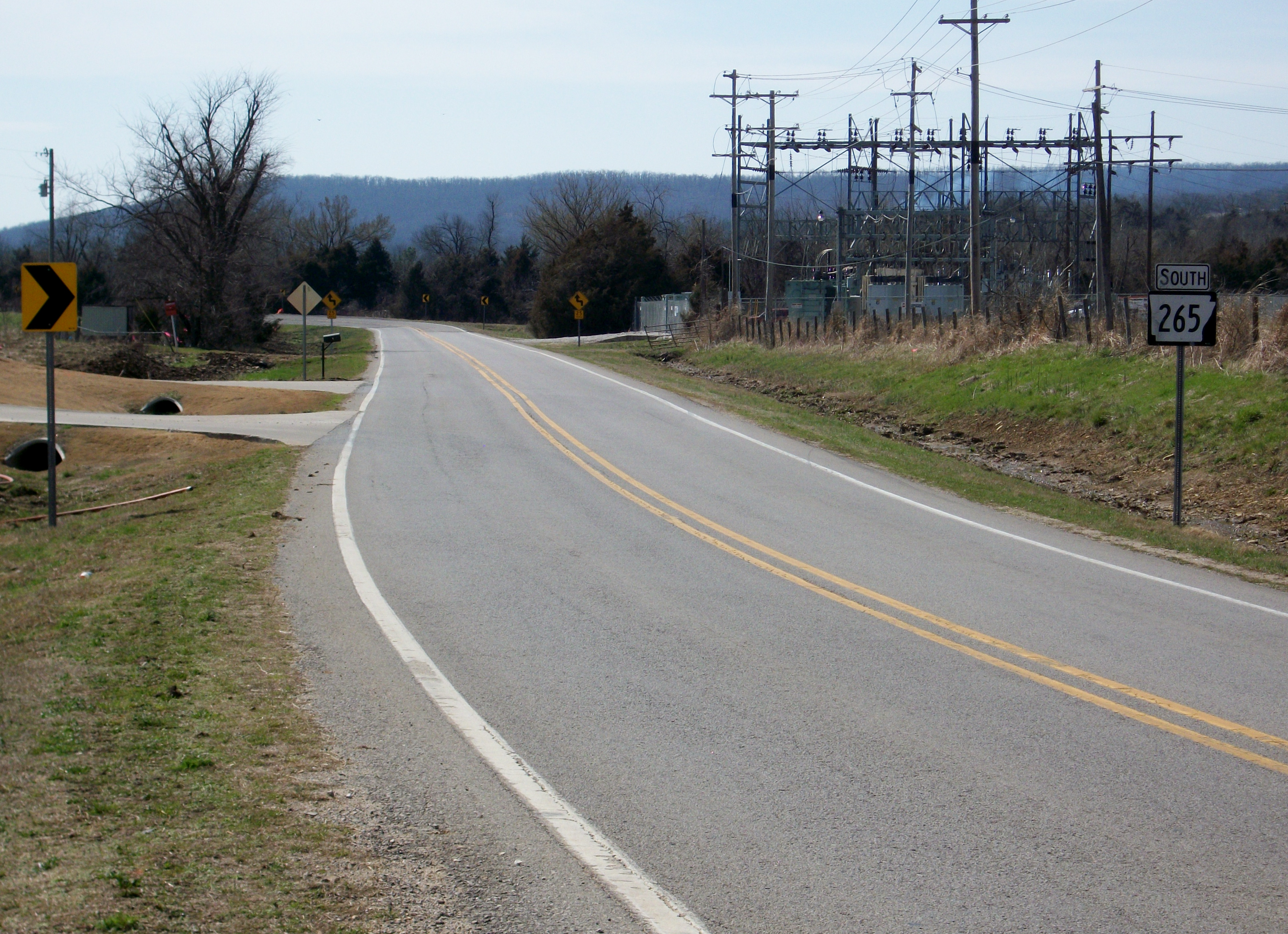
Butterfield Overland Mail Route near Greenland, Washington County, Arkansas, in March 2011

- Fort Smith
- Van Buren
- Woolsey's Station (also called Signal Hill)
- Brodie's Station (Lee Creek)
- Park's Station
- Fayetteville
- Fitzgerald's Station (near present-day Springdale, Arkansas)
- Callahan's Station (near present-day Rogers, Arkansas)
- Elkhorn Tavern in Pea Ridge National Battlefield

== Missouri Stations ==
- Harbin's Station
- Crouch's Station
- Smith's Station
- Ashmore's Station
- Springfield
- Evan's Station
- James H.M. Smith's Station
- Bolivar
- Yoast's Station
- Quincy
- Bailey's Station
- Warsaw
- Burn's Station
- Mulholland's Station
- Schackleford's Station
- Tipton
- Pacific Railroad
- St. Louis

== See also ==
- Butterfield Overland Mail in California
  - Butterfield Overland Mail in Baja California
- Butterfield Overland Mail in New Mexico Territory
- Butterfield Overland Mail in Texas
- Butterfield Overland Mail in Indian Territory

Map Creations Using Original Surveys from the Bureau of Land Management (BLM), General Land Office (GLO) Records. USGS Historical Topo Map Explorer. Corrected with USDS 3DEP Elevation Program – LIDAR. Placed into 1873 Campbells New Atlas of Missouri. Butterfield Overland Mail Route commentary information from: The Butterfield Overland Mail 1857–1869 by Roscoe P. Conkling and Margaret B. Conkling. Missouri Historical Review April-1858.
