= 1849 in rail transport =

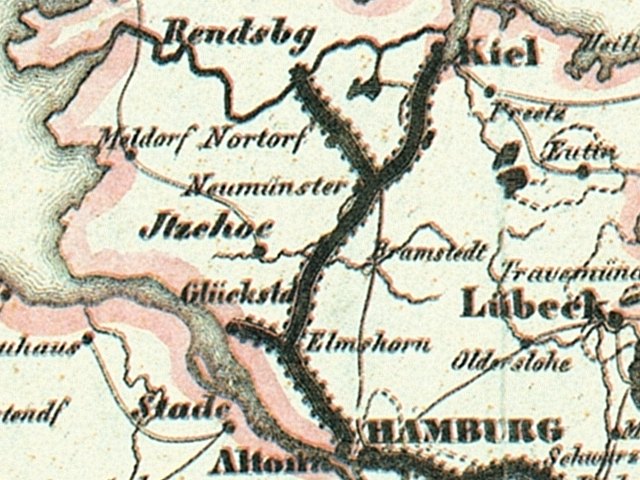
A railroad in Germany

This article lists events related to rail transport that occurred in 1849.

== Events ==
=== January events ===
- January 27 – The North Carolina General Assembly incorporates the North Carolina Railroad to complete a rail line from Goldsboro through Raleigh and Salisbury to Charlotte.

=== February events ===
- February 20 – The Scioto and Hocking Valley Railroad (which eventually was absorbed by the Baltimore and Ohio Railroad) is chartered in Ohio to build a railroad from Portsmouth through Piketon and Chillicothe to Lancaster.

=== March events ===
- March 3 – The Pacific Railroad, a predecessor of the Missouri Pacific Railroad, is chartered in Missouri.
- March 5 – The Blue Ridge Railroad is chartered by the Virginia General Assembly to construct a rail line over the Blue Ridge Mountains for the Louisa Railroad.
- March 24 – The Pittsburg and Steubenville Railroad, which eventually became the Pittsburgh, Cincinnati, Chicago and St. Louis Railway after a foreclosure sale, is chartered in Pennsylvania.
- March – The governments of India and England form the first agreements of the Old Guarantee System providing land grants to English companies for railroad construction in India.

=== June events ===
- June 20 – First tube of Robert Stephenson's Britannia Bridge is floated into position on the Menai Strait for the Chester and Holyhead Railway's North Wales Coast Line with many leading British railway civil engineers present.

=== July events ===
- July 5 – First part of Paris-Est–Strasbourg-Ville railway opens in France.
- July 20 – The Manchester, South Junction and Altrincham Railway opens to the public in England, the first suburban railway.

=== August events ===
- August 15 – Robert Stephenson's High Level Bridge for the York, Newcastle and Berwick Railway at Newcastle upon Tyne, England is opened permanently for rail traffic.
- August 17 – The Old Guarantee System providing land grants to English companies for railroad construction in India is finalised.

=== September events ===
- September 1 – The first segment of the Pennsylvania Railroad, from Lewiston to Harrisburg, Pennsylvania, opens for service.
- September – Train ferry PS Leviathan, designed by Thomas Grainger for the Edinburgh, Perth and Dundee Railway, is delivered for carrying freight cars across the Forth estuary in Scotland between Granton and Burntisland.

=== November events ===
- November 1 – The Caledonian Railway is opened throughout between Glasgow, Carstairs and Carlisle, completing a through rail route by the West Coast Main Line and providing the first service of through carriages between Scotland and England.

== Births ==
=== October births ===
- October 17 – Sir William Mackenzie, part-owner of the Toronto Street Railway, builder of Canadian Northern Railway predecessors (d. 1923).

=== December births ===
- December 12 – William Kissam Vanderbilt, heir to Cornelius Vanderbilt and president of the New York Central system (d. 1920).
