= Burke's Station =

Butterfield Overland Mail stagecoach stop in Arizona

- Location within Arizona Location within the United States
- Coordinates: 32.9569913°N 113.3062975°W
- Country: United States
- State: Arizona
- County: Maricopa
- Elevation: 443 ft (135 m)
- Time zone: UTC-7 (MST (no DST))
- GNIS feature ID: 23887

Burke's Station was a stagecoach station on the Butterfield Overland Mail route in Arizona. It was named in 1858 after Patrick Burke, the first proprietor of the station. It was temporarily closed when the Butterfield line shut down during 1861 due to the American Civil War. Burke's was located 9.43 miles from Grinnels Ranch approximately halfway over the difficult route to Oatman Flat. It was afterward purchased by King Woolsey. Later revived as a stagecoach station in 1866, it was purchased by William Fourr who also sold flour and groceries there and acquired a dairy herd. Then in 1869, Fourr sold Burkes Station and it continued as a stage station until the Southern Pacific Railroad arrived in Arizona, making it obsolete. After closure as a stage station, the name was changed to 'Burkes Ranch' and by 1900 to 'Alpha' (AZ-T101).
