= Mowry City, New Mexico =

Coordinates: 32°30′51″N 107°54′52″W

Mowry City is a ghost town first in Doña Ana County, then Grant County and finally in Luna County, New Mexico, United States, approximately 25 miles (40 km) north of Deming. Originally it was the crossing point of Cooke's Wagon Road on the Mimbres River. Mowry City was formerly the location of Rio Mimbres, a stop on the San Antonio-San Diego Mail Line, and Miembre's River Station, a stagecoach stop on the Butterfield Overland Mail and later stagecoach routes. The town lasted from 1859 until the arrival of the railroad in southern New Mexico in 1881.

== History ==
Mimbres River Station, a Butterfield Overland Mail relay station, was located 16 miles northeast of Ojo de Vaca Station and 18 miles west of Cooke's Spring Station. Later Mowry City grew up around it.

Mowry City was the result of one of the earliest land scams in the American Southwest. In the late 1850s, three promoters, Samuel J. Jones (a native of Virginia and former sheriff of Douglas County, Kansas), Lewis S. Owings and Robert P. Kelley, resided in the town of Mesilla on the Rio Grande near Las Cruces, New Mexico. They owned a number of businesses in the town and also had interests in mining properties. They realized that the existing population base was too small for them to attain the prosperity they desired, so they concocted a scheme to establish a town site and promote it, to draw settlers into the area.

Kelley had met Sylvester Mowry in 1858, on a stage ride from Arizona to Missouri, from which he learned of Mowry's fame and name recognition among eastern investors. Realizing the recognition value of the Mowry name, these promoters chose Mowry City as the name for their new town.

In 1859, Kelley and his partners published a pamphlet, "Report of the Mowry City Association, Territory of Arizona, for 1859". This painted a picture of Mowry City as the future site of the territorial capital of Arizona (at that time, the name Arizona was applied to the southern half of New Mexico Territory, from the Staked Plains of Texas to the Colorado River border of California), and greatly misrepresented the area's resources and prospects. The report was published in Palmyra, Missouri, where Kelley and his brother-in-law, D. W. Hughes, opened an agency for the Mowry City Association and published a newspaper, the Mesilla Miner. This paper contained fraudulent articles portraying Mowry City and the Mesilla Valley as a thriving, peaceful region. In fact, the area was plagued by hostile Apaches. Years later, a settler who knew Kelley and his partners in the late 1850s reminisced that they printed their newspaper and prospectus in Missouri because those publications were "not intended for the public eye so near home," and that the entire promotion was a "swindle."

In the Spring of 1860, gold was discovered at Pinos Altos, about 40 miles northwest of the new town site, and Mowry City began to establish a population, including Sherod Hunter. However, as a result of the Bascom Affair at the outbreak of the American Civil War, the Apaches began their campaign of attacks on all white settlers, miners, and travelers throughout the region, and this ended the promotion of Mowry City.

The settlement lasted after the Civil War at least into the time of the arrival of the railroad in 1881. Mowry City in 1871 is described by S. M. Ashenfelter in one of his reminiscences contributed to the Silver City Independent:

At Mowry City, on the Mimbres (now Whitehill's ranch), there was a considerable population. R. V. Newsham and M. St. John had large stocks of general merchandise. A. Voorhces ran a hotel, which afterwards came into the hands of "Old Man" Porter, father of Frank and Harry Porter, well known in later years. Kimberlan & Company had a flouring mill, and Dick Mawson and "Hairtrigger John" Gibson did the blacksmithing for the countryside. The main mail line west from Mesilla to Tucson passed through Mowry City. It was run by J. F. Bennett & Co., the company being Henry Lesinsky and Con Cosgrove. It was the old Southern Overland route, coming up by the way of Rough and Ready, Slocum's ranch, Fort Cummins and Cook's Canyon; and it crossed the Mimbres at Mowry City. In the spring of 1871 the branch line to Fort Bayard, Silver City and Pinos Altos was run by W. H. Wiley & Company. Slocum's was as famous in its day as Fort Cummins, and John D. Slocum was a man of recognized eminence on this frontier.

Another, less complimentary, description of Mowry City from about the same time was given by Loreta Janeta Velazquez:

Striking south-westward from Fort McRae, we came to Rio de los Mimbres, near the head of which is Mowry City, founded by Lieutenant Mowry, who could not have had any very clear ideas as to what he was about when he attempted to make a settlement in such a place. Mowry City has a hotel, one or two stores, and more drinking-saloons than do it any good. That it will ever be much of a place I do not believe. There is not water enough in the river the greater part of the time to float two logs together, and in very dry weather one can step across it without wetting the feet. A sudden shower will, however, convert this puny creek in a short time into a raging river, which carries everything before it, and then it will subside as suddenly as it arose.

== See also ==
- List of ghost towns in New Mexico
