= Cow Springs Ranch =

Locale in Luna County, New Mexico: Overland Mail stagecoach stop

Coordinates: 32°24′43″N 108°10′43″W

- Location within New Mexico
- State: New Mexico
- Country: United States of America
- Established: 1858
- Produces: cattle
- Status: operating

Cow Springs Ranch, formerly Ojo de Vaca Station, is a ranch headquartered at Cow Springs in Luna County, New Mexico, originally Ojo de Vaca when it was a Butterfield Overland Mail stagecoach station at Ojo de Vaca (Cow Springs), in New Mexico Territory. It was located 14 mi (23 km) northeast of Soldiers Farewell Station and 16 mi (26 km) southwest of Miembre's River Station, later Mowry City.

== History ==
Ojo de Vaca was a watering place on the old trail between Janos, Chihuahua, Mexico to the Santa Rita copper mines. When Cooke's Mormon Battalion was searching for a wagon route between the Rio Grande and California, they intercepted the old Mexican road at this spring, then followed it southward to Guadalupe Pass then westward and northward to Tucson, pioneering the route known as Cooke's Wagon Road. In 1849, Cooke's road became the major southern route of the forty-niners during the California Gold Rush and Ojo de Vaca spring was one of the reliable watering places on what became the Southern Emigrant Trail. Later Ojo de Vaca was a water station on the San Antonio-San Diego Mail Line and subsequently the Butterfield company built their stagecoach station there. It remained an important stop on this route until the long distance stagecoach lines ended in the late 19th century. Subsequently, the Butterfield Overland Mail built Ojo de Vaca Station as a stagecoach station at Ojo de Vaca, in New Mexico Territory. It was located 14 miles northeast of Soldiers Farewell Station and 16 miles southwest of Miembre's River Station, later Mowry City, New Mexico. It remained an important stop on this route until the long distance stagecoach lines ended in the late 19th century.
