= Battle of Stanwix Station =

Westernmost skirmish of the American Civil War

Coordinates: 32.93352°N 113.39255°W

- Part of the Trans-Mississippi Theater of the American Civil War
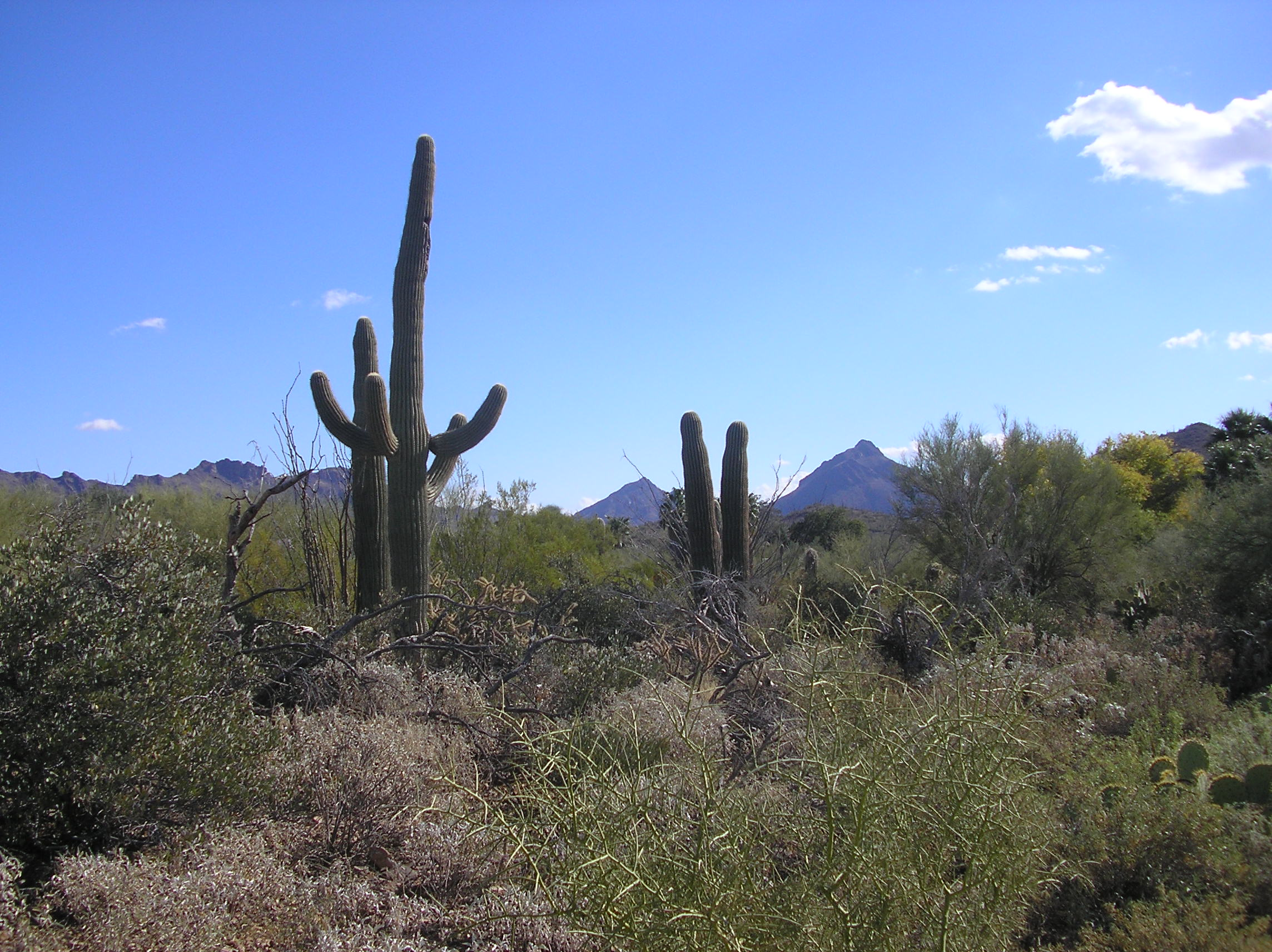
- The desert in Arizona, where Stanwix Station lies.
Date	March 30, 1862
Location	New Mexico Territory (USA), Arizona Territory (CSA); Modern Day: Yuma County, 6 miles SW of Agua Caliente, Arizona
Result	United States victory

Belligerents
United States	(Confederate States of America) Confederate States

Commanders and leaders
William P. Calloway	John W. Swilling

Strength
272	10

Casualties and losses
1 wounded	None

Stanwix Station, in western Arizona, was a stop on the Butterfield Overland Mail Stagecoach line built in the later 1850s near the Gila River about 80 miles (130 km) east of Yuma, Arizona. Originally the station was called Flap Jack Ranch later Grinnell's Ranch or Grinnell's Station. In 1862, Grinnell's was listed on the itinerary of the California Column in the same place as Stanwix Ranch (or Stanwix Station) which became the site of the westernmost skirmish of the American Civil War. A traveler in 1864, John Ross Browne, wrote Grinnell's was six miles southwest of the hot springs of Agua Caliente, Arizona.

== Skirmish at Stanwix Station ==
The westernmost skirmish of the American Civil War, which occurred at Stanwix Station, took place on March 29, 1862, when Capt. William P. Calloway and a vanguard of 272 troops from the California Column discovered a small detachment of Confederate Arizona Volunteers led by 2nd Lt. John W. Swilling burning hay, which had been placed at Stanwix Station for the California Column's animals. After a brief exchange of gun fire with the much larger Union force, the Confederates retreated to Tucson, the capital of the western district of the Confederate Territory of Arizona. The skirmish resulted in the wounding of a German-born Union private, William Frank Semmelrogge (Semmilrogge), who subsequently recovered. There appear to have been no other casualties.

The significance of the incident was twofold. First, the burning of hay, not only at Stanwix but at five other former stagecoach stations along the Gila River east of Fort Yuma, delayed the California Column's advance to Tucson and Mesilla, the territorial capital of Confederate Arizona. Before the Confederates evacuated Tucson, they also removed or destroyed the supplies gathered for the Union advance by Ammi S. White at the Maricopa Villages. Secondly, and of more immediate importance, Swilling was able to reach Tucson and warn Capt. Sherod Hunter, district military commander of western Confederate Arizona, of the approaching California Column. This led Hunter to place pickets at strategic locations, leading to the Battle of Picacho Pass.

== Stanwix Station ==
The stagecoach lines were abandoned in the 1880s when the Southern Pacific Railroad (SPRR) completed laying track to Tucson from Yuma. The SPRR built a station just to the east of the Maricopa County line on Stanwix Flats and called it "Stanwix Station."

== See also ==
- La Paz Incident

== Sources ==
- The Confederate Arizona Campaign of 1862, Col. Sherrod Hunter Camp 1525, SCV, Phoenix, Arizona.
- Hunt, Aurora, James Henry Carleton, 1814–1873, Frontier Dragoon, Frontier Military Series II, Glendale, California: Arthur H. Clark Company, 1958. (Hunt states that John Swilling led the Confederates at Picacho Pass, but this is persuasively contradicted by the other source above, who show that Swilling was actually elsewhere guarding Union prisoners at the time.)
- Masich, Andrew E., The Civil War in Arizona; the Story of the California Volunteers, 1861–65 Nornan: University of Oklahoma Press, 2006.
- Josephy, Alvin M. Jr. (1986). War on the Frontier: The Trans-Mississippi West. Alexandria, Va.: Time-Life Books. ISBN 0-8094-4780-0.
- Fort Bowie National Historic Site
- Hart, Herbert M. "The Civil War in the West". California and the Civil War. The California State Military Museum.
