= Oak Grove, San Diego County, California =

Unincorporated community in California, United States

Oak Grove, California
- Unincorporated community
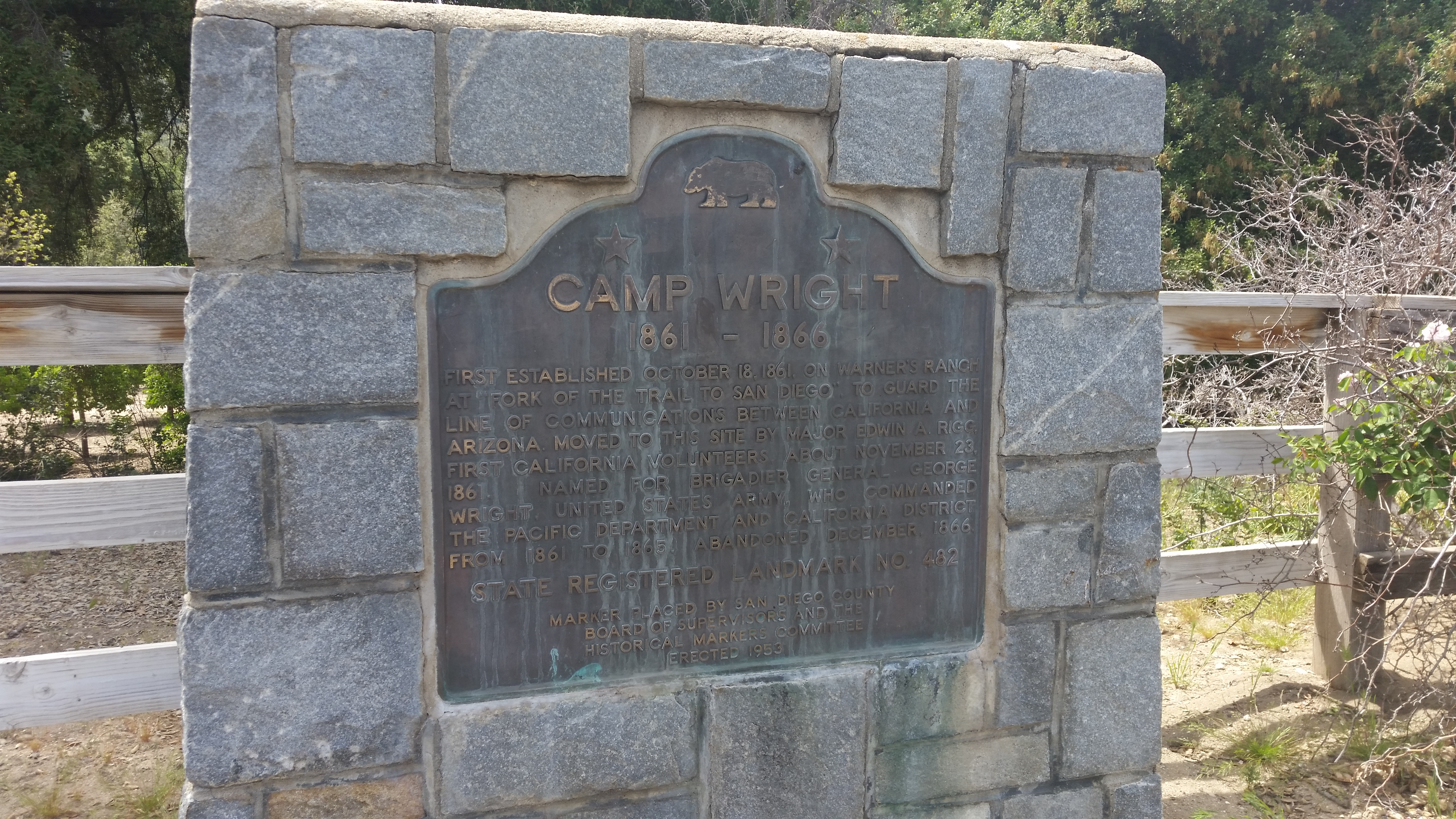
- Camp Wright Historical Marker

- Location within California Location within the United States
- Coordinates: 33°23′06″N 116°47′21″W
- Country: United States
- State: California
- County: San Diego
- Elevation: 2,785 ft (849 m)
- Time zone: UTC-8 (Pacific (PST))
  - Summer (DST): UTC-7 (PDT)
- Area codes: 619 & 858
- GNIS feature ID: 272744

Oak Grove is an unincorporated community in northern San Diego County, California, United States. The community is on California State Route 79, 22 miles (35 km) east-southeast of Temecula. It is home to the Oak Grove Butterfield Stage Station.
