= Soldier's Farewell Stage Station =

Overland Mail stagecoach stop in New Mexico, US

Soldiers Farewell Stage Station
- Locale
- Nickname: Soldier's Farewell
- Location within New Mexico Location within the United States
- Coordinates: 32°21′24″N 108°22′9″W
- Country: United States
- State: New Mexico
- County: Grant County
- Elevation: 5,144 ft (1,568 m)
- Time zone: UTC-7 (Mountain (MST))
  - Summer (DST): UTC-6 (MDT)
- GNIS feature ID: 894993

Soldiers Farewell Stage Station was a stagecoach stop of the 1858-1861 Butterfield Overland Mail route before the company moved to the central route (former Pony Express route). West of "Soldiers Farewell Hill" on the west bank of a drainage arroyo, the stop was on the Butterfield Overland Mail route (1858-1861) in Grant County, New Mexico. According to the Overland Mail Company Through Time Schedule, it was 150 miles (33½ hours) west of El Paso, Texas and 184½ miles (41 hours) east of Tucson, Arizona. Located 42 miles east of Stein's Peak Station and 14 miles southwest of Ojo de Vaca Station.
