= Butterfield Overland Mail =

Stagecoach service in the US (1858–1861)

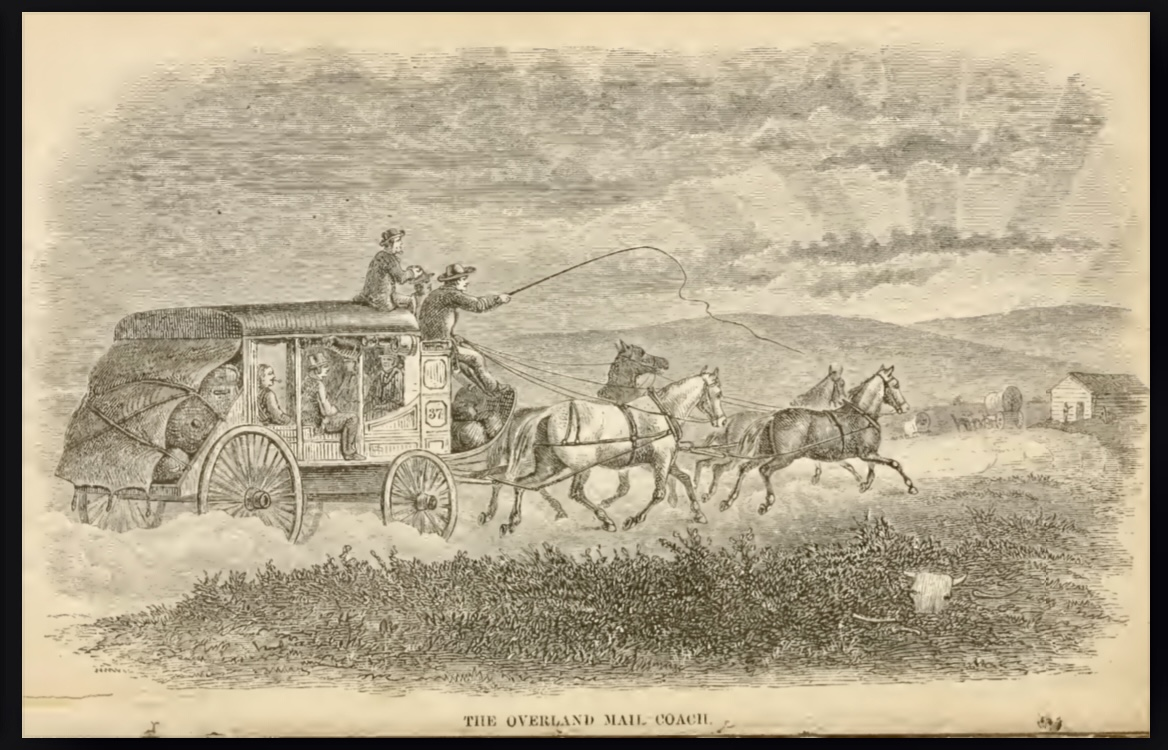
- "The Overland Mail Coach," illustration from Arizona, As It Is (1877)
- Industry: Postal service
- Headquarters: United States

Butterfield Overland Mail (officially Overland Mail Company) was a stagecoach service in the United States operating from 1858 to 1861. It carried passengers and U.S. Mail from two eastern termini, Memphis, Tennessee, and St. Louis, Missouri, to San Francisco, California. The routes from each eastern terminus met at Fort Smith, Arkansas, and then continued through the Indian Territory (Oklahoma), Texas, the present-day states of New Mexico and Arizona, parts of northwestern Mexico, and then into California, ending in San Francisco.

Before the late 1850s, there was no regular overland mail delivery service through the interior of the Western United States; parcels traveling from the Eastern United States to the Far West or vice versa had to be sent by ship on the long voyage around South America, or had to be carried overland personally. There were few reliable trails across the American frontier and all of the routes were long, arduous, and frequently dangerous. On March 3, 1857, Congress authorized United States Postmaster General Aaron V. Brown to contract for delivery of the U.S. mail from St. Louis to San Francisco. The first overland mail destined for the West Coast was delivered by the San Antonio–San Diego Mail Line that same year, in June 1857.

The route was designated a National Historic Trail in 2023.

== Origins ==
=== John Butterfield, president of Overland Mail Company ===
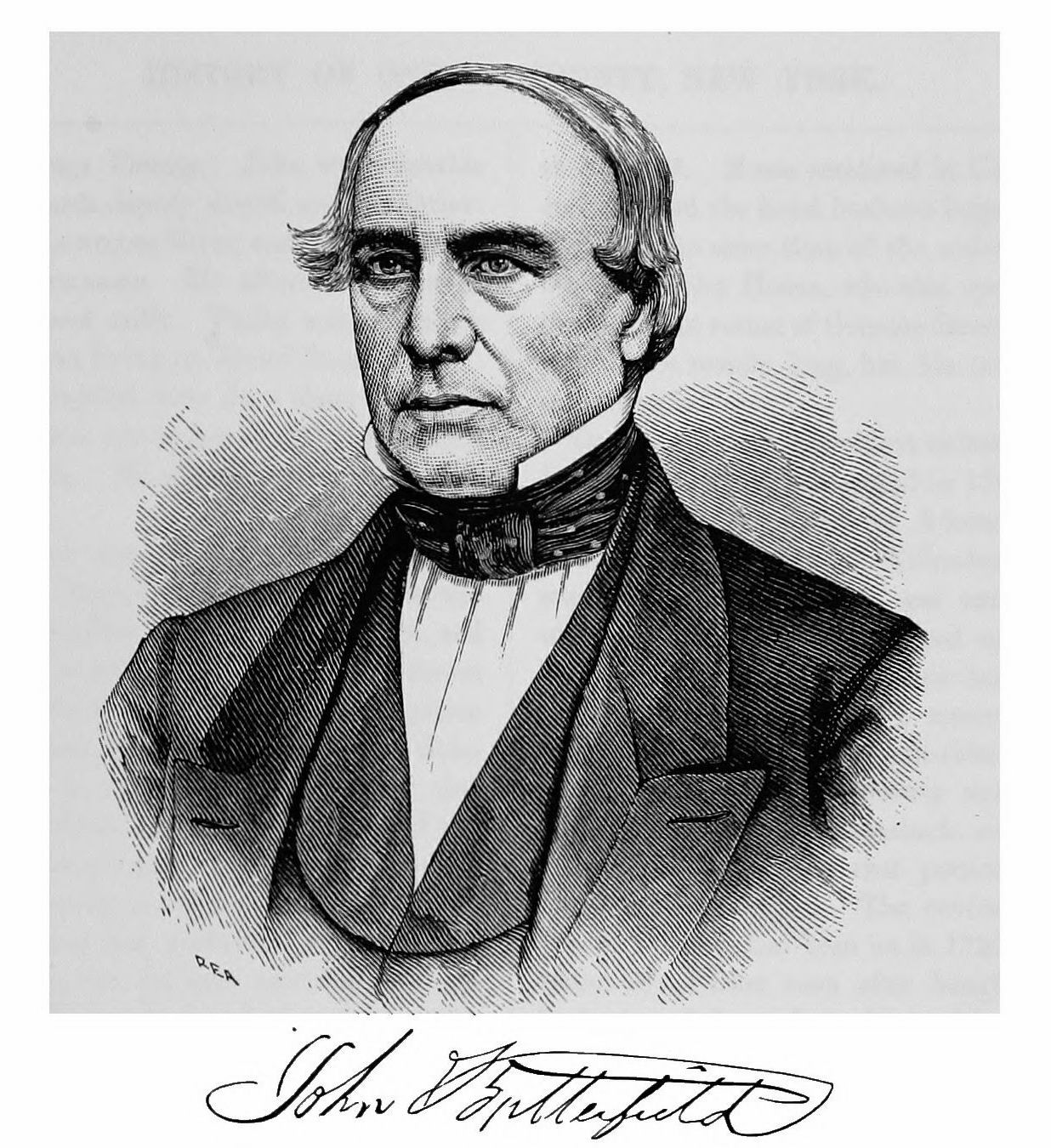
John Butterfield and signature

John Butterfield, born in 1801 and raised near Albany, New York, became involved in the stagecoach business at early age, first working as a driver for various stage lines in Upstate New York and eventually operating his own lines, which were successful until the first railroads were built in the region. By 1857, Butterfield had nearly 40 years of experience working for and running stage lines. This was one of the reasons that Postmaster General Aaron V. Brown awarded him the lucrative government contract to carry the U.S. Mail.

Through the 1840s and 1850s there was a desire for better communication between the east and west coasts of the United States. There were several proposals for a transcontinental railroad connecting the two coasts, and surveys were undertaken to identify a possible route for this railroad beginning in the 1850s, but a more immediate realization was an overland mail route across the west. Congress authorized the Postmaster General to contract for mail service from Missouri to California in order to facilitate communication with and settlement in the West. The Post Office Department advertised for bids for an overland mail service on April 20, 1857. Bidders were to propose routes from the Mississippi River westward. Nine bids were made by some of the country's most experienced stagecoach operators and express companies.

None of the express companies, such as American Express, Adams Express, or Wells Fargo & Co. Express, bid on the contract because they did not have experience running stage lines at the time. A suggestion by The New York Times that the express companies could do a better job than the Overland Mail Company drew a sharp rebuttal from a Washington, D.C., newspaper.

Mail Contract No. 12,578, for $600,000 per annum for a semi-weekly service, was awarded to John Butterfield of Utica, New York, who was president of a company he created specifically to bid on the contract, which he named the Overland Mail Company. This was the longest mail contract ever awarded in the United States. It was a stockholding company and the main stockholders, besides Butterfield, were also fellow directors of the company: William B. Dinsmore of New York City; William G. Fargo of Buffalo, New York; James V. P. Gardner of Utica, New York; Marquis L. Kenyon of Rome, New York; Alexander Holland of New York City; and Hamilton Spencer of Bloomington, Illinois. There were four others listed as sureties (security against loss). Almost all of the stockholders were connected to other businesses in Upstate New York and most lived near Butterfield's home in Utica, New York. Alexander Holland was Butterfield's son-in-law and treasurer of the Overland Mail Company. Dinsmore was vice-president of the company. The company's office was located in New York City.

Why John Butterfield was chosen was stated by Postmaster General Aaron Brown:

... a route which no contractor had bid for, but one which in the judgement of A.V. Brown, of Memphis, had more advantages than any other, and, as John Butterfield & Co. had, in the opinion of Brown, greater ability, qualification and experience than anybody else to carry out a mail service, John Butterfield & Co. was selected and preferred.

The route proposed by Butterfield, known as the "Oxbow Route" because of its long curving route through the Southwest, was 600 miles (970 km) longer than the Central Overland Trail, but had the advantage of being free of snow year-round.

== Route ==
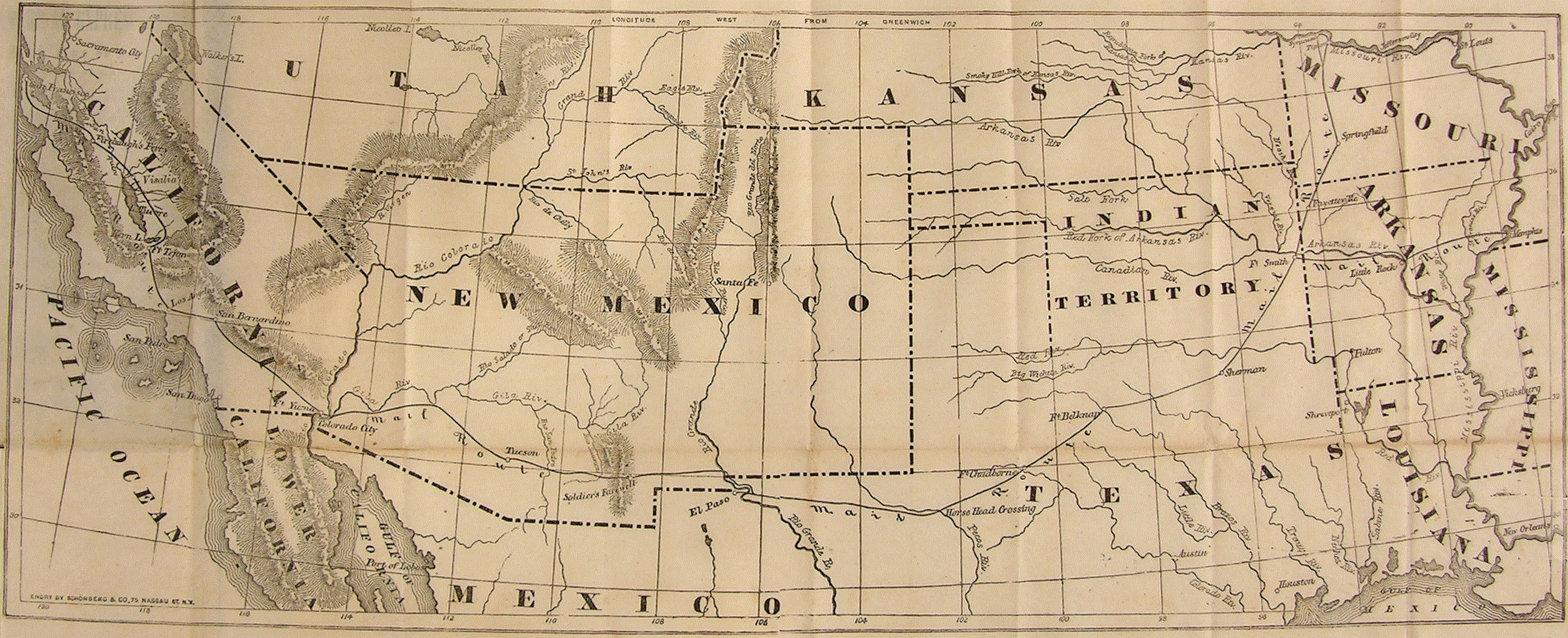
The stage routes from a Butterfield Overland Mail Company map

The contract with the U.S. Post Office, which went into effect on September 16, 1858, identified the route and divided it into eastern and western divisions. Franklin, Texas, later to be named El Paso, was the dividing point, and these two regions were subdivided into minor divisions, five in the East and four in the West. These minor divisions were numbered west to east from San Francisco, each under the direction of a superintendent.

=== Kenyon and Butterfield Jr.: architects of the Butterfield Trail ===
John Butterfield Sr. turned to two of his most trusted and experienced employees to establish the Butterfield Trail. In 1858, with expedition leader Marquis L. Kenyon, John Butterfield Jr. helped to select the route and sites for the stage stations. Kenyon was also a stockholder/director of the Overland Mail Company and the only stockholder other than Butterfield to have significant staging experience. Marquis moved from Mannsville, Jefferson County, New York, to Rome, New York, in 1838. Rome was twelve miles from Butterfield's home in Utica. Kenyon immediately became involved with staging. His obituary gives a good summation of his staging activities in Upstate New York and what led him to be involved with the Overland Mail Company:

"His prior occupation was a humble one—that of driver of a stage-coach between Utica and Oswego. It was but two or three years before he had saved enough money from his wages to purchase an interest in the stage-coach line of which he was an employee; and once having placed his foot on the first steps of the ladder, he soon rose, by his business tact and assiduity, to be the principal proprietor of the stage-coach lines converging to this point. At the time that railroads supplanted stages on the leading routes, Mr. Kinyon [Kenyon] was one of the most extensive owners of stage-coach property in Central New York. After the introduction of railroads, he continued to carry on the business of mail contractor and stage proprietor on the small lateral lines; but his business energies were too expansive to be thus curtailed, and he soon found ampler vent for them than the _______ of his former vast carrying business afforded. Hence, when the overland mail route to California was projected, Mr. Kinyon [Kenyon] found a field of business enterprise more commensurate with his capacities. He it was who went over the whole route originally, and surveyed it from the eastern terminus to its western in California." Returning, he procured the necessary equipment for the route, and went over it again, organizing the route as he proceeded, and remained for nearly a year in California, in charge of the western terminus of the road."

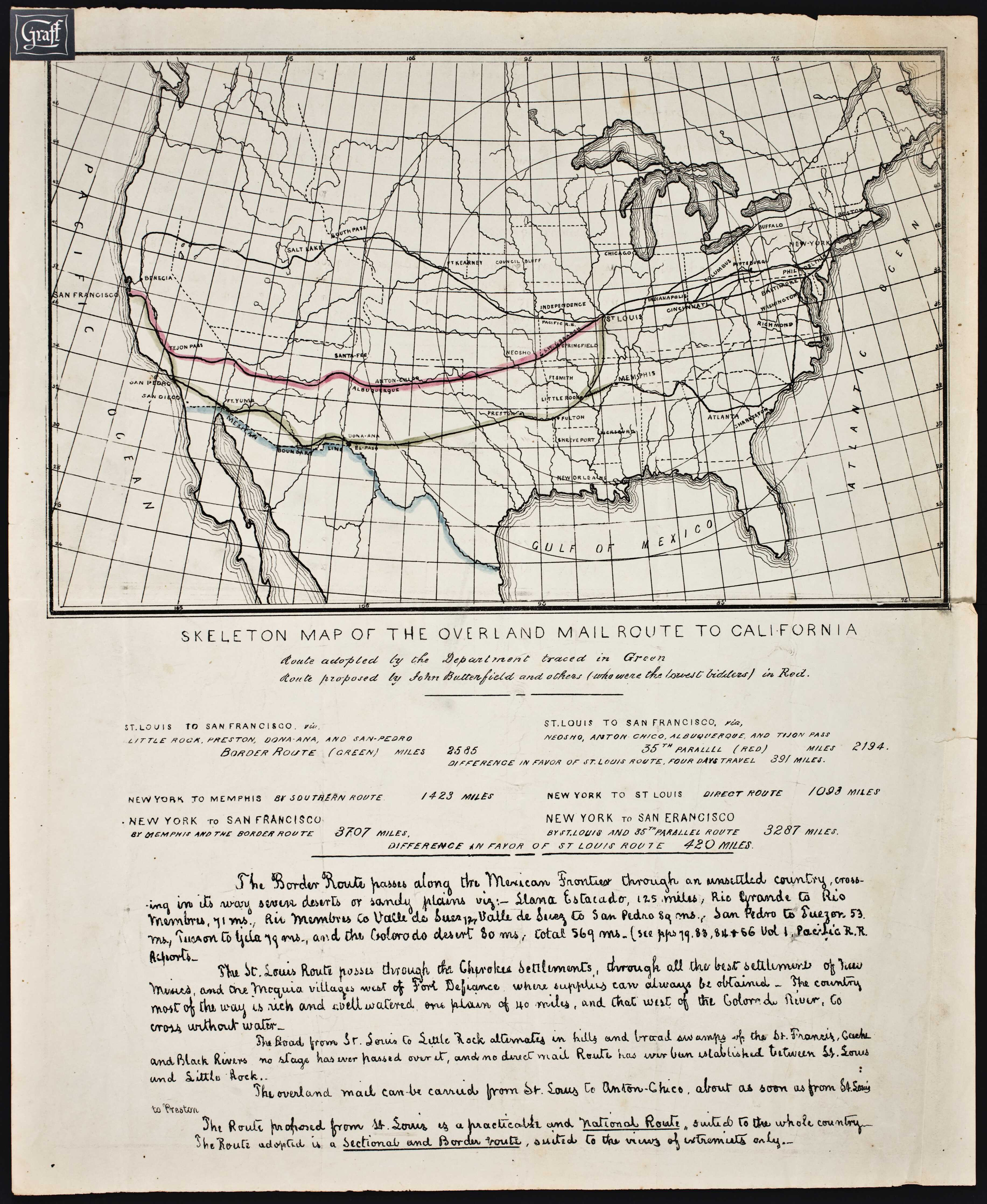
Competing overland mail routes to California

After winning the contract on September 16, 1857, Butterfield had one year to organize the trail and immediately sent his hand-picked team, headed by Kenyon, to San Francisco to begin the task. The steamer Star of New York left New York on November 20, 1857, with passengers "M.L. Kinyon [Kenyon], J. Butterfield [Jr.], F. De Ruyter and S.K. Nellis, who go out to open the Pacific Mail Route across the plains and arrange the western terminus of said route." The party left San Francisco on January 16, 1858, to begin laying out the trail and selecting the sites for stage stations. They traveled by mule, covering about 40 miles (64 km) per day. Another party left St. Louis about the same time. Both were to meet at El Paso and then return to St. Louis. The party from St. Louis included G. W. Wood, Jesse Talcott, and Charles P. Cole. A newspaper in Fort Smith, Arkansas, reported:

"The parties met at El Paso and after recruiting [used in the sense of recovering] a few days, the above gentlemen left for this city—making the trip to this place in twenty-two days from El Paso, and thirty-one days from San Francisco to El Paso, or fifty-six days, through with wagons. …The party from California, in crossing Arizona, took a middle route between Beale's and the Southern route – (but little traveled heretofore,) pronounced by them, as an excellent road."

Another report describes the arrival of the two parties at Fort Smith and describes how the original choice for the trail did not satisfy Kenyon and his party, so that they returned from El Paso by a different route, which later became the trail:

"A portion of the exploring party sent out by the Overland Mail Company, for the purpose of examining the routes for the carriage of the mails from the Valley of the Mississippi to the Pacific coast, which left this city on the 3rd of January last, reached Fort Smith, Arkansas, on their return home, on the 17th inst., accompanied by four of the party which left San Francisco on the 16th of January, on purpose to examine that portion of the route from the Pacific to the Rio Grande. They left El Paso on the 22d of March, thus accomplishing the distance from the Rio Grande to Fort Smith—nine hundred and thirty miles—in the short space of twenty-five days, which we believe is the quickest time on record in crossing the Plains. The party was composed of only eight men, as follows: Major George W. Wood, Jesse Tolcott, Charles P. Cole and J.A. Lilly, of the St. Louis party, and Lieut. Frank de Ryther, James Swartz and John Butterfield Jr. of the San Francisco party. They brought with them one wagon and thirteen animals, which they left at Fort Smith for the party proceeding East. The route traveled on the return trip was different from the one passed over in going out, ... "

John Jr.'s obituary summarized his accomplishment:

"John Butterfield [Jr.], the man who helped link the East to the West in establishing his famous Overland Mail Route more than half a century ago, died recently at his house in Utica, aged 82 years. His father, John Butterfield, was a superintendent of the Overland Mail Route from San Francisco to St. Louis and thence to eastern cities. The younger Butterfield first traversed the famous route, marked the stations, superintended the work of organization and drove the first stage over the route.

=== John Butterfield makes the Southern Overland Trail his own ===
The history of the Butterfield Trail and the westward emigrant trails are intertwined. It was the purpose of awarding the contract to the Overland Mail Company, on September 16, 1857, not only for a land route to deliver mail from the East to the West coast, but also to aid emigrant travel to settle the West. Butterfield accomplished this purpose by providing an improved trail and water sources at regularly spaced stage stations. When researchers hike the Southern Overland Corridor, the most visible ruts are those of the route that the Overland Mail Company established, which others followed. Even though its services ceased on the Southern Overland Corridor in March 1861 due to the impending Civil War, the route was so efficient that it remained little changed until its demise with the completion of the first railroad through the region in 1880. For this reason, to this day, the Southern Overland Trail is commonly called "The Butterfield Trail".

The building of the trail was in two sections: the 462-mile (744 km) San Francisco to Los Angeles section and the rest of the 2,238-mile (3,602 km) distance to Tipton, Missouri. The San Francisco to Los Angeles section was previously one of the most developed. Some changes were made from Los Angeles to San Francisco. Settlements and wagon roads used by local stage lines were strung out between the two cities. Some existing structures, such as ranch houses and hotels, were contracted as stage stations. One of the most famous was at Vallecito in San Diego County, which is preserved as an historic site. Kenyon's hardest task building the trail was east of Los Angeles, where his trail was mostly in the open Mojave Desert.

=== Sections shortened or improved ===
Waterman L. Ormsby, a correspondent for the New York Herald and a passenger on the first stagecoach going west in September 1858, wrote in his reports of Marquis L. Kenyon's part in building the trail and the advantage for emigrants. He discussed the many improvements on the Texas side of the Red River starting about eight miles below Preston.

A lengthy new section of road in Texas was also described:

"Another disadvantage under which we labored, this trip, was that our road, for the most of the way, was nearly new, though Mr. Bates claims that from Sherman to [Fort] Belknap at least forty miles are saved by it. It leads through the counties of Grayson, Cooke, Jacks [Jack], Montague, Wise, and Young, all of which contribute towards its expenses, and certainly it must be a favorite with some, for, though only opened one month before I passed over it, it was already pretty well marked with wagon tracks. …It must of course improve with every day of its use."

Another Texas section:

"The new road from Grape Creek to the head of Concho River, Texas, on Mr. Glover's division, is also in good order for travel and saves another thirty miles [the total length for this new section is 122 miles]. The New Pass between Los Angeles, and Fort Tejon, California, has been much improved under the superintendence of M.L. Kinyon [Kenyon], as have also been other portions of the route. The route of the company will, of course, be a favorite emigrant route, and will, therefore, be in better order than before, in fact, each month will add new facilities to the overland mail."

Goddard Bailey's report shows that there were 139 stations at the beginning of Butterfield's service, but by the time the line ceased operations, the line had been improved by the addition of 36 more, for a total of 175. The new stations were assigned 320 acres each and many took advantage of the large allotment of land by growing crops which aided the line.

Although there were springs and rain-fed waterholes along the trail, many did not have sufficient water capacity to supply the line's operators and its emigrant passengers. These were dug out to hold a larger capacity. Cisterns were constructed at some of the stations and water wagons were used to transport water from distant sources to fill the cisterns. At the Hueco Tanks in Texas, Ormsby tells of the tanks being enlarged by Butterfield to hold a year's supply of water.

In June 1860, Butterfield passenger William A. Wallace reported to the Daily Alta California the following:

"Between Vallecito and Algodones there are eight of these stations, varying from nine to sixteen miles apart. Wells have been sunk at each station, and abundance of good water is obtained, except at the Monument and Garden stations. These waters are brackish and bitter—a flavor not delicate to the taste. Drinking-water is carried from the other stations. These stations are of incalculable worth to emigrants, who are no longer forced to depend upon the precious supply of water which the wells, afforded, and which were liable to be covered up by the sand-waves that move over the desert."

Other improvements to the trail by Butterfield were the building of bridges:

"Fourteen miles from Boggy Depot [Indian Territory, now Oklahoma] we came to Blue River station, where a heavy bridge is building for the company."

There were two bridges in Arizona. One was across the San Simon River near the San Simon Stage Station, and the other across the San Pedro River just north of the San Pedro River Stage Station.

The trail that John Butterfield had established was so efficient that it was little changed until its demise in 1880 with the completion of the railroad, and the impact the Butterfield Trail had for settling the West cannot be understated, as written by President James Buchanan congratulating Butterfield for his achievement:

"Washington, Oct. 9, 1858

John Butterfield, Esq.:

Sir – Your dispatch has been received. I cordially congratulate you upon the result. It is a glorious triumph for civilization and the Union. Settlements will soon follow the course of the road, and the East and West will be bound together by a chain of living Americans, which can never be broken."

As predicted by President Buchanan, increased emigration was indeed a result of the improved trail. Just after service officially began in September 1858, there were many newspaper accounts reporting a large increase in the number of emigrants on the trail. The San Antonio–San Diego Mail Line was operating on 900 miles of the improved trail and benefited by the regularly spaced water holes at Butterfield's stations. In October 1859, Superintendent Isaiah C. Woods complimented Butterfield for these improvements and the benefit to the San Antonio—San Diego Mail Line:

"The San Diego Overland Route – Interesting News – From I.C. Woods, who has just crossed the continent on the San Diego and San Antonio Line, says the San Diego Herald, we gather some items which may be of interest: Woods pays a high compliment to the staging of the Butterfield Overland Company, along the Gila and over the Desert, particularly to Superintendent Buckley and Warren Hall, the Road Agent of this division [for Butterfield's Overland Mail Company. They have, he says, really worked wonders in organizing their road in a manner which would be a model in any country. The immigrants are coming slowly along, feeling in no hurry to enter California much before the rains have brought on the new grass. The stations of the Overland Mail companies and the wells dug by these enterprising men, are proving of incalculable benefit to those crossing with their own teams. The immigration on the Southern route, this year, will figure up from ten thousand to fifteen thousand souls, with a very large amount of cattle and sheep. The old complaints of the immigrants are at present unheard of, owing to the better knowledge of the country now so readily obtained.”

Route divisions of the Butterfield Overland Mail route
Division	Route	Miles	Hours
Division 1	San Francisco to Los Angeles	462	80
Division 2	Los Angeles to Fort Yuma	282	72.2
Division 3	Fort Yuma to Tucson	280	71.5
Division 4	Tucson to Franklin	360	82
Division 5	Franklin to Fort Chadbourne	458	126.3
Division 6	Fort Chadbourne to Colbert's Ferry	282 1/2	65.3
Division 7	Colbert's Ferry to Fort Smith	192	38
Division 8	Fort Smith to Tipton	318 1/2	48.6
Division 9	Tipton to St. Louis by railroad	160	11.4
Totals		2,795	596.3

=== San Francisco to Memphis ===
As noted above, the route from San Francisco to Fort Smith was the same for both routes. Travel time from Fort Smith to Memphis was about the same as to St. Louis. Management of the route from Fort Smith to Memphis was included in Division 8. However, because of the untamed nature of the Mississippi River and its Arkansas tributaries in those years, the southern route necessarily utilized various alternative routes and methods of travel. At that time, there was no Mississippi River bridge at Memphis, and the Memphis and Little Rock Railroad ran from Hopefield near present-day West Memphis, Arkansas, only to a point 12 miles east of Madison, Arkansas, on the St. Francis River. From there the route headed overland by stagecoach. When the Arkansas River was high enough, the mail could instead travel from Memphis by steamboat down the Mississippi to the mouth of the Arkansas River, navigate up that river to Little Rock, and on from there by stagecoach. When the Arkansas was too low for steamboat traffic, the Butterfield could take the White River to Clarendon, Arkansas, or Des Arc, Arkansas, before switching to the stagecoaches. Sometimes the entire route across eastern Arkansas would be by stage.

== Butterfield's stagecoaches, celerity wagons, and water wagons ==
No one on a Butterfield stage was ever killed by outlaws, but some died in accidents caused by the mostly unbroken mules or mustangs running wild. Butterfield's stages were not allowed to carry shipments of valuables. In Butterfield's instructions to his employees was "No money, jewelry, bank notes, or valuables of any nature, will be allowed to be carried under any circumstances whatever." For this reason, the idea of a "shotgun" rider next to the driver was not employed by Butterfield. When correspondent Ormsby asked one of the stage drivers, "Have you any arms?", the stage driver answered, "No, I don't have any; there's no danger." However, most people on the Butterfield stages were armed, especially in Comanche and Apache territory. In October 1859 correspondent Farwell was a passenger heading east on a Butterfield stage and wrote the following:

"After leaving this station [Arizona's San Pedro River Stage Station], the conductor asked 'how many of us were armed', and requested that those who had arms should have them ready for use, as we now were in the Apache country. Guns and pistols were produced, and we rode all night with them in our hands."

=== Mail stagecoach ===
This draft animal-drawn passenger and mail stage had a strong sub-frame covered by decorated wooden paneling with ornate doors and comfortably padded seats. They often had window openings, but the western models designed for the rougher conditions had no glass panels. The roof was strong enough to support a metal railing upon which luggage could be carried. Seats were often provided on the roof. A canvas-covered boot at the back was used for luggage and mailbags. The difference between a stagecoach and a mail stagecoach was that a large compartment was provided below the driver's seat to carry mail and the rear boot for mail was larger. Butterfield's stagecoaches were used on 30 percent of the Southern Overland Trail, at the eastern and western ends.

=== Stage (celerity) wagon ===
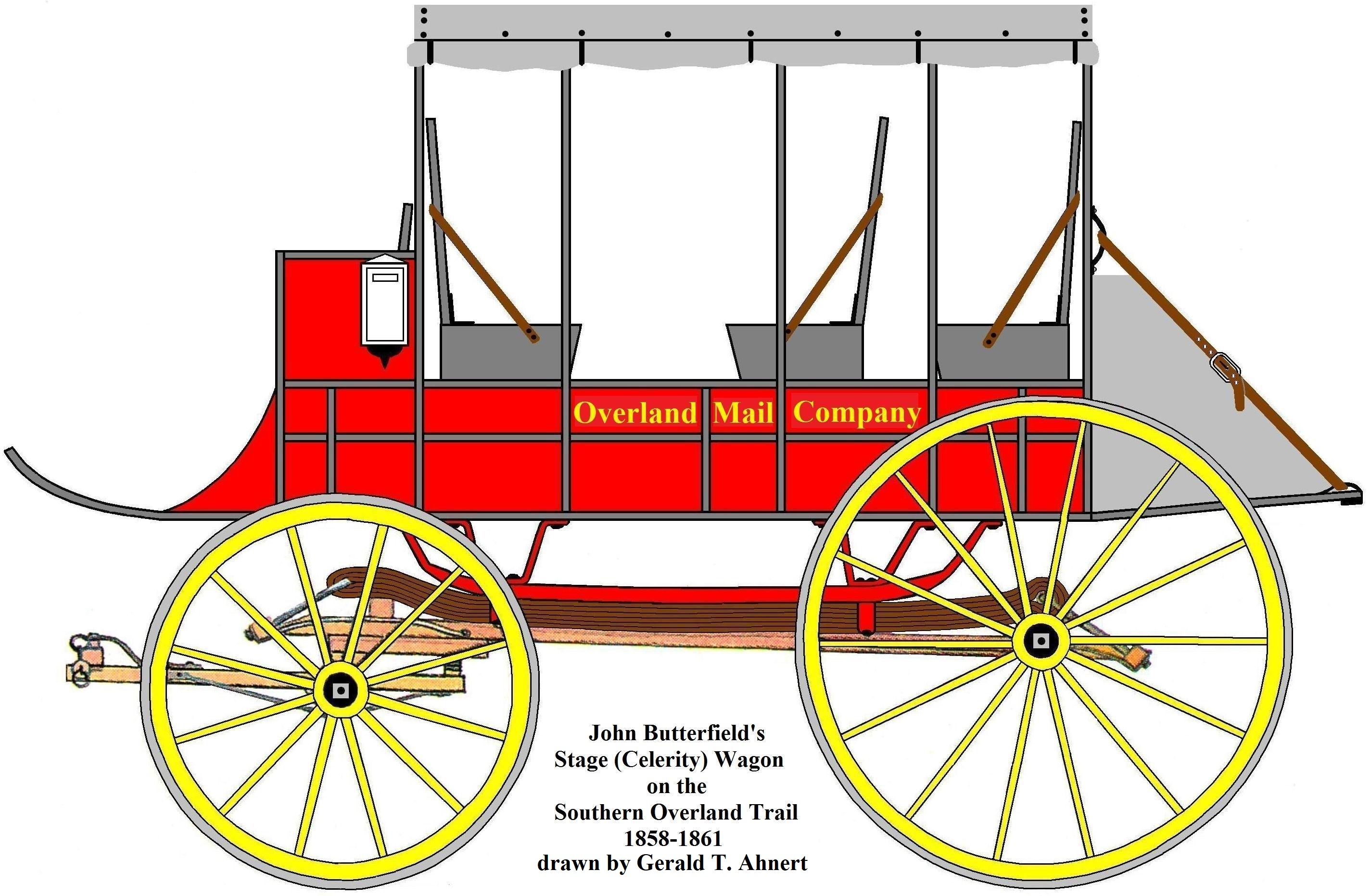
Butterfield's stage (celerity) wagon partly designed by John Butterfield. Sixty-six were employed from Fort Smith, Arkansas, to Los Angeles, California.

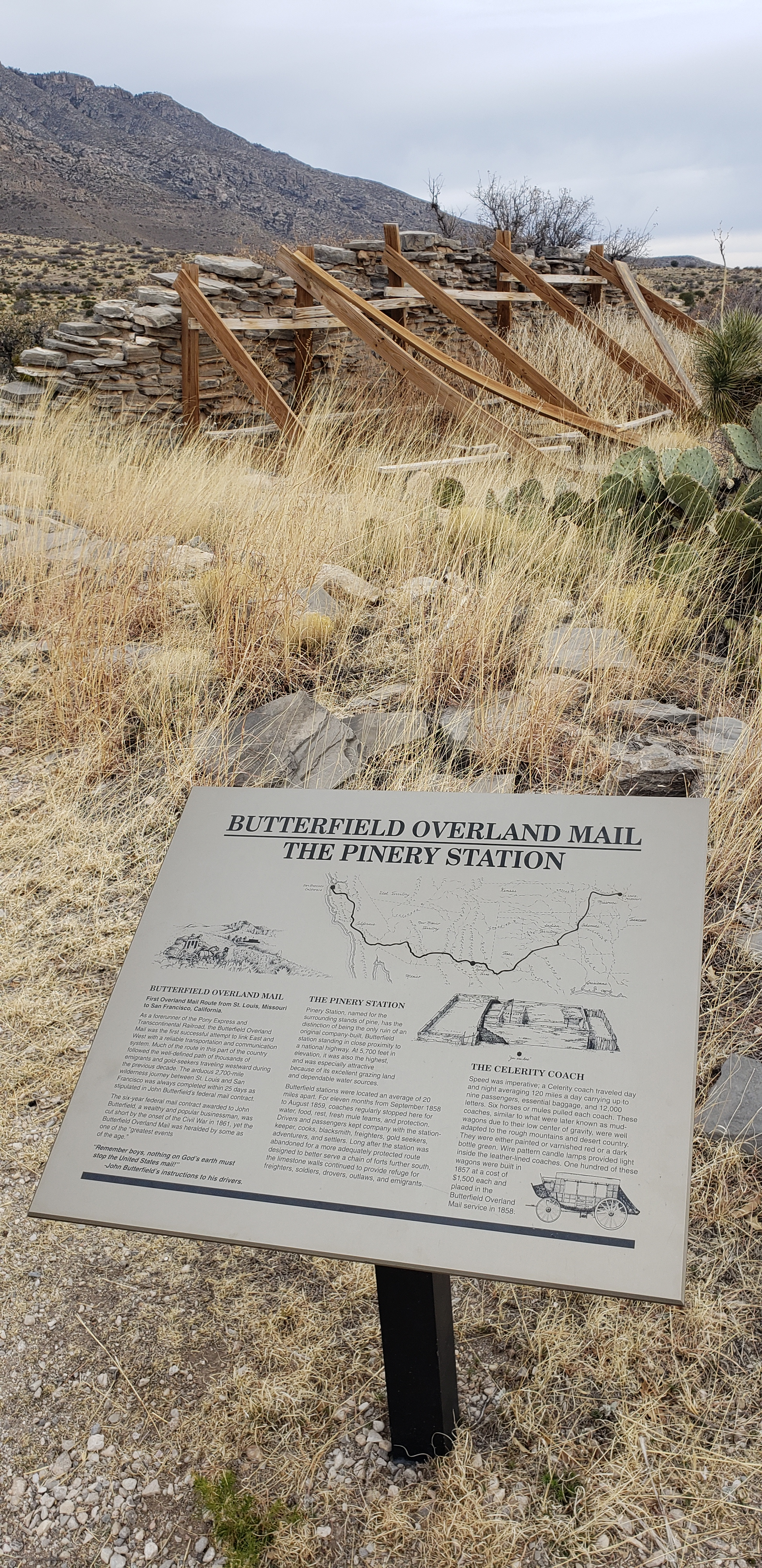
Pinery Station in Guadalupe Mountains National Park

Celerity means "swiftness of speed". The term "celerity wagon" is sometimes used instead of "stage wagon". It was about 60 percent of the weight of a typical stagecoach and was designed for the rough frontier conditions where the trail was not as well developed, especially for traveling in sand and traversing steep inclines. These coaches were open on the sides with no doors or windows. Often a canvas top was supported by light uprights. They had canvas or leather curtains fastened to the top that could be rolled down as a barrier to the dust. The stage wagon was used by Butterfield's Overland Mail Company exclusively on 70 percent of the Southern Overland Trail on the 1,920-mile (3,090 km) section between Fort Smith and Los Angeles. Although the famous passenger wagon manufacturers Abbot-Downing Co. and J.S. & E.A. Abbot Co., of Concord, New Hampshire, never used the name "mud wagon" in their catalogs, there were others who referred to the stage wagon as a "mud wagon".

=== Butterfield stage manufacture ===
Newspapers published an article in June 1858 that Butterfield's mail stagecoaches and stage wagons were made by the J.S. & E.A. Abbot Co. of Concord, New Hampshire. Unfortunately the original order book for that time period in 1858 is missing from the Abbot-Downing Archives. According to the articles, a total of 100 stages were ordered and either put into use or distributed to stations along the trail. Another important reference is from Goddard Bailey's report to the government on his inspection trip of the trail in September 1858. He stated in the report "The road is stocked with substantially-built Concord spring wagons..." A July 1858 Memphis newspaper article tells how the stages were delivered and who made them. This, of course, was the famous J.S. & E.A. Abbot:

"The Overland Mail Company received by the Lady Walton [riverboat], on Tuesday evening last, six stages, and on Wednesday, Mr. Glover left [from Fort Smith] to the direction of El Paso with four of them.... The stages were manufactured at Concord, New Hampshire, according to directions given by Col. John Butterfield. They will accommodate from six to nine passengers...."

Another article a week later in the same Memphis newspaper stated that 60 more were to come. The use of "Concord" stagecoaches was also mentioned by Ormsby. There were many similar descriptions of Butterfield's stage (celerity) wagons given by newspaper correspondents, including one by Ormsby:

"They are made much like the express wagons in your city which carry goods for transshipment, only they are heavier built, have tops made of canvas, and are set on leather straps instead of springs. Each one has three seats, which are arranged so that the backs let down and form one bed, capable of accommodating from four to ten persons, according to their size and how they lie. From Memphis [actually Little Rock] and from St. Louis [actually Tipton] to Fort Smith regular stage coaches are used, similar in every respect to those employed in the Atlantic States; but from Fort Smith onwards the vehicles used are not unlike a Jersey wagon, they are of the description known as Celerity wagons, being similar in build to the common Troy coach, and the body is hung upon the same kind of springs [thorough-brace] and in a similar manner. Instead, however, of the heavy wooden top, with iron railing around it, in common use, they have a light canvas covering supported by light uprights, after the manner of a Jersey wagon. The covering affords ample protection against the weather, while it greatly diminishes the weight of the vehicle as well as its liability to upset. Each one had three seats, which are arranged so that the backs let down and form one bed, capable of accommodating from four to ten persons, according to their size, and how they lie. The company has over one hundred of these coaches on the ground, and has been running them regularly and with profitable results, for some time past, upon portions of the route."

The same stage or stage driver was not used all the way through on the 2,700-mile (4,300 km) trip. They were changed frequently, both to avoid fatigue for the stage drivers and to avoid the braking down of the stages. Ormsby reported that "I understand they [Overland Mail Company] have bought horses and mules, and a wagon or coach for every thirty miles, of the route, while arrangements have been made at all the stations for changing horses, feeding, &c., so that they can run straight through."

From these references it is seen that Butterfield employed 100 stages distributed along the 2,700-mile trail from Tipton, Missouri, to San Francisco, California. Approximately 34 western-style J.S. & E.A. Abbot mail stagecoaches were used on the settled and partially settled sections of the trail from Tipton, Missouri, to Fort Smith, Arkansas, and from Los Angeles to San Francisco, California. Stagecoach trails had already been established between these points, with a few Butterfield improvements to the trail. About sixty-six J.S. & E.A. Abbot stage (celerity) wagons, partially designed by John Butterfield, were distributed on the 1,920-mile trail through the frontier from Fort Smith, Arkansas, to Los Angeles, California.

=== Other wagons ===
Other wagons used by Butterfield were water wagons and freight wagons. Water wagons were an important though expensive necessity. In order to straighten out the trail, so that the stages would not have to zig-zag from water hole to water hole, water wagons were used to transport water from a source to stage stations that were built on the straight-line sections. An example was Ewell's Stage Station in the Sulphur Springs Valley of eastern Arizona. When the Butterfield service first opened, the trail jogged northwest after leaving Apache Pass to Dos Cabezas Spring and then southwest to Dragoon Springs Stage Station at the foot of the Dragoon Mountains. In the spring of 1858 a new trail was constructed from the western entrance of Apache Pass and then along an almost straight line to the north end of the Dragoon Mountains. At approximately the midpoint of this new section, a station and cistern were constructed. A water wagon was used to supply the cistern with water from Dos Cabezas Spring, which was four miles north of the new station. Water wagons were also used to supply unusually long stretches of trail that lacked water sources. A newspaper article described one of these situations:

"Chidester also informs us of the means to supply the stations in the Llanos Estecados [in Texas], or Staked Plains, with water. This desert, by the route of the Company's road, is seventy-five miles wide. From streams on either side of the Plains the Company supplies water to the stations with regular water trains, fitted up expressly for the purpose. The wagons used for this purpose are constructed of large tin boilers, similar in shape to the boilers of a steamboat, and capable of holding as much water as a team of six mules can draw. These trains run regularly, conveying water to the different stations, where large reservoirs are prepared to receive and preserve it for the use of passengers and the employés and stock of the Company. This is, of course, a very expensive method of supplying the indispensable element, but, as thus far all efforts to obtain it by boring or otherwise have proved little, the Company must submit to it for the present."

== Subcontractors ==
Butterfield subcontracted the section between Des Arc and Fort Smith, Arkansas, to Chidester, Reeside & Co.:

"The Overland California United States Mail left Memphis on Thursday [September 16] last. It is brought by the Memphis and Little Rock Rail Road to within twelve miles of Madison, on St. Francis River, thence by light vehicles to Des Arc—thence by Messrs. Chidester, Reeside & Co.'s line of four horse U.S. Mail coaches to Fort Smith where it meets the St. Louis mail. Messrs. Chidester, Reeside & Co., are subcontractors under Butterfield & Co., from Memphis to Fort Smith…"

In an interview Chidester stated that he was using Butterfield's stage wagons:

"The vehicles used upon the road between Fort Smith are of the description known as Celerity wagons…. The company [Butterfield] have over one hundred of these coaches on the ground…"

== Stage drivers ==
The stage drivers, like many of Butterfield's employees, were mostly from upstate New York. An example for the many Butterfield employees being from New York State is shown in the 1860 Federal Census for Tucson. On page one a caption states "Great Overland Mail Stations," and of the 40 entries, 16 are listed as being born in New York State. Correspondent Ormsby reported that:

"The employees of the company, I found, without exception, to be courteous, civil, and attentive. They are most of them from the East, and many, especially of the drivers, from New York state. I found the drivers on the whole line, with but few exceptions, experienced men. Several are a little reckless and too anxious to make fast time, but as a general thing they are very cautious."

== Draft animals ==
Correspondent Ormsby reported: "Our horses were four in number, that being the allotment all along the line from Tipton [Missouri] to San Francisco [California]." Many correspondents' reports describe the problems for the Overland Mail Company using unbroken wild mules and mustangs between Fort Smith, Arkansas, and Los Angeles, California. By most accounts, wild mules were used and some wild mustangs. It is surprising that the use of wild draft animals did not hinder the Overland Mail Company stages from accomplishing its contractual agreed to time schedule. The problem with the unbroken mules and mustangs was expressed in correspondent Farwell's report:

"We arrived at the station about 10 o'clock, A.M., about 1 mile to the eastward of the river. Some coffee was prepared for us, and we were soon ready to start again. This time, after we were all seated in the coach, the horses, which were said to have been always kind and gentle, refused to move. After a great deal of beating, coaxing and a trial of various methods suggested by almost every one present, we were all obliged to get out again, and after a great deal of trouble, the horses were started, but the passengers being out of the coach, the driver was obliged to stop again, and again, after they were in, the horses refused to go. After working with the might and main for some time, they were got off upon a run, and this time they were kept going. Hitherto, in starting from any station, a person was obliged to stand at the heads of the horses—they being with a few exceptions' wild ones—until the driver was seated on his box, the reins gathered and everything in readiness, when he would give the signal, "turn 'em loose," or "let 'em go," and they would go upon a run. As we get further along, however, they are growing tame, and are more easily handled."

== Sleeping on the stages ==
For the 25-day trip, the Butterfield stages did not stop for the passengers to sleep. They had to sleep on the stages. Many correspondents reported humorous stories about their experiences trying to sleep on the Butterfield stages. One of the most common problems was the losing of their hats while sleeping caused by the open-sided stage (celerity) wagons providing little protection from the wind. National Park Service Historian Frank Norris stated in an interview that "According to historian Gerald T. Ahnert, 'pulling up to a Butterfield stage station was like making a NASCAR pit stop.'"

== Extant Butterfield stages ==
All the stages that weren't in use were distributed at stations along the 2,700-mile trail. At the closing of Butterfield’s operations on the Southern Overland Trail in March 1861, because of the start of the Civil War, many of the stages were confiscated and used by the Confederate Army as military vehicles. As much of the equipment as possible was transferred to the central trail to continue the Overland Mail Company contract. Only enough of the stages made it to the central route to operate the line from Salt Lake City, Utah, to western Nevada. The biography of Edwin R. Purple tells of transferring the stages to the central route. He was employed by the Overland Mail Company as a financial agent at Fort Yuma, California, in May 1860. At the closing of the line, on the Southern Overland Trail, in March 1861, he was ordered to transfer the stock and stages from Tucson, Arizona, to Los Angeles, California, to supply the central route line, which was to commence operations on July 1, 1861. On May 8, 1861, with 30 men, he left Los Angeles and successfully arrived at Salt Lake City on June 16 with 18 stage wagons and 130 horses. In a discussion by Gerald T. Ahnert with members of the True West Historical Society, it was suggested that many of these original stagecoaches and stage wagons were bought by movie companies in the 1930s through 1950s and used in their movie productions. Many were destroyed in scenes of the stages being attacked.

== Operations ==
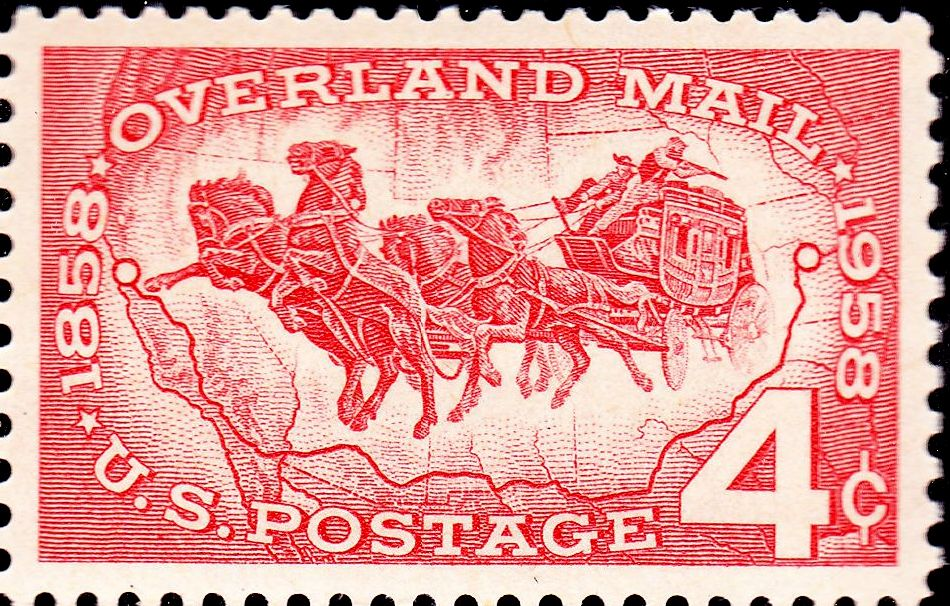
Overland mail commemorative stamp issued by the U.S. Post Office, 100th Anniversary, October 10, 1958

Butterfield's Overland Mail Company held the U.S. Mail contract from September 16, 1858, on a six-year contract. The first stage going east left San Francisco at 10 minutes past midnight on September 14, 1858. The mail from San Francisco reached St. Louis in 24 days, 18 hours, and 26 minutes. The first stage going west left Tipton, Missouri, at 8 am on September 16, 1858. The mail was carried by railroad for the first 160 miles (260 km) from St. Louis to Tipton.

Butterfield's Overland Mail Company made two trips a week from September 1858 to March 1861. At the start of service, the mail would leave St. Louis, Missouri, and San Francisco, California, every Monday and Thursday. A December 1, 1858, advertisement stated that the days for departure from San Francisco on Monday and Friday and that the through fare to Terminus of Pacific Railroad as $100. An advertisement appeared in the same newspaper on January 11, 1859, that the through fare to Terminus of Pacific Railroad had increased to $200. Butterfield's Overland Mail Company had 139 stage stations at the start of service but more stations were built after service started and increased to about 170. As noted about 100 stages were employed.

=== Pony Express as part of the Overland Mail Company contract ===
When the Overland Mail Company Contract No. 12578 was transferred to the Central Overland Trail, the contract was amended on March 12, 1861, to include the Pony Express. The new contract stated the following:

"And to be required also, during the continuance of their contract, or until completion of the overland telegraph, to run a pony-express semi-weekly at a schedule time of ten days, eight months of the year, and twelve days four months of the year [presumably the winter months], and to convey for the Government free of charge five pounds of mail matter, with liberty of charging the public for transportation of letters by said express not exceeding $1 per half ounce. The compensation for the whole service [which included the stage line mail service] to be $1,000,000 per annum, to take effect on or before the 1st of July, 1861 and to expire the 1st of July, 1864 [the same date for the end of the old contract No. 12578]. The number of the route to be changed to 10773 and the service to be recorded in the route register for Missouri."

In behalf of the Overland Mail Company, the order was signed by president W.B. Dinsmore. William B. Dinsmore became president after John Butterfield was voted out as president. Butterfield still remained a stockholder. The Pony Express was terminated before the end of the contract because the telegraph line was completed October 24, 1861.

A correspondent for the New York Herald, Waterman L. Ormsby, remarked after his 2,812-mile (4,525 km) trek through the western US to San Francisco on a Butterfield Stagecoach thus: "Had I not just come out over the route, I would be perfectly willing to go back, but I now know what Hell is like. I've just had 24 days of it." Ormsby was the only passenger on the first East-West run of the Butterfield Stage who journeyed the entire distance of the mail route. He sent periodic dispatches to the paper describing his journey, including the pickup of passengers outside the Lawrence Livery Stables.

Near the end of Butterfield's service, in March 1861 on the Southern Overland Trail, John Butterfield was voted out as president of the Overland Mail Company because he wasn't making money for the stockholders. He remained a stockholder in the company and attended the meetings with vice-president William B. Dinsmore now elevated to president of the company. The Congressional report shows the modifications to the six-year Butterfield contract ending on September 15, 1864. Kirby Sanders was the National Park Service consulting historian and lead researcher for compiling the history for the master Special Resource Study for the Butterfield National Trail project and put into perspective the confusion over Wells, Fargo & Co.'s only involvement on the Butterfield Trail (Southern Overland Trail). He stated that they had only a secondary role and may have run a "trunk route" off of Butterfield from Los Angeles to San Diego. Waddell F. Smith, grandson of William Bradford Waddell, one of the founders of the Pony Express put into perspective the later involvement of Wells, Fargo & Co., two years after the Butterfield contract ended. What was known as the "Grand Consolidation," of the three stage lines, that held the mail contract on the Central Overland Trail, was achieved by Ben Holladay, "The Stagecoach King." The three lines now comprising the consolidation were the Pioneer Stage Line, the Overland Mail Company, and Wells, Fargo & Co. This three-million-dollar corporation, formed on February 5, 1866, became a new giant with an increased capitalization of ten million dollars. Wells, Fargo & Co. changed its name to Wells, Fargo and Company and was approved by the stockholders on December 10, 1866. Wells, Fargo and Company bought out Ben Holladay and was finally operating as a mail carrying stage company, with their name finally on a transom rail of a stagecoach, on the Central Overland Trail. But the end was in sight, as the construction of the Transcontinental Railroad was nearing completion. On May 16, 1868, the board of directors of Wells, Fargo and Company authorized the sale of the company's stage lines, although they remained in operation until the completion of the railroad on May 10, 1869.

=== Transfer to Central Overland Trail ===
Butterfield’s Overland Mail Company was ordered to transfer the company to the Union-held Central Overland Trail, because of the impending start of the Civil War. The last Overland Mail Company mail bag left St. Louis, Missouri, March 18, 1861. This last mail arrived in San Francisco, California April 13, 1861.

William Buckley, of Watertown, New York, was the Superintendent of the Fourth Division for Butterfield's Overland Mail Company on the Southern Overland Trail. When Butterfield's Overland Mail Company contract was transferred to the Central Overland Trail, although some of the employees returned to Upstate New York, some retained their positions with the company. William Buckley was one of the original employees to continue with the company on the Central Overland Trail and took the position of Superintendent. Although William B. Dinsmore was now the company president, John Butterfield was still a stockholder and it can be seen in this article that the Overland Mail Company was still called "Butterfield's" by the employees.

Only enough equipment and employees were transferred to stock the trail from Carson City, Nevada, to Salt Lake City, Utah. A June 1861 newspaper accounted the details:

"Great Salt Lake City, June 5, 1861. ... William Buckley, formerly the Superintendent of the Butterfield route from San Francisco to El Paso, F. Cluggage, an Agent in that route and Bolivar Roberts, the Superintendent of the western division on this route, came in a week ago yesterday from Carson, which I noticed in my last letter, and on Friday Edward Fisher, and four other employees in some department, came in from St. Joseph. ...They have, whatever else besides, at least made all the necessary arrangements for a vigorous start to the daily mail, and everything will be ready by the first week in July [July 1 was when the line was ordered to start by the new contract] to fulfill the of obligations of the million contract. ... Last evening, profiting by a conversation with Mr. Buckley, I obtained from him a copy of his measurement of the road from Carson to this city [Salt Lake City]. ... Placerville [California] being the terminus, another 100 miles should be added between that and Carson, as the entire distance of the Butterfield new route. These are the stations now in use and to be continued, from the facilities they afford of proximity to wood, water and feed; but I am informed the Butterfield Company propose erecting intermediate stations every twelve miles, on account of the greater amount of horses required for the accomplishment of the journey within the specified time of sixteen days from St. Joseph to Placerville.”

Under the Confederate States of America, the abandoned Butterfield route between Texas and Southern California operated under a new Federal contract as part of the Overland Mail Corporation route with limited success by George Henry Giddings. The contract was given in May 1861 and was to start on April 1, 1861, and to end on June 30, 1862. "An attempt was made to fulfill the contract, beginning April 1, but faced with insurmountable obstacles and with the development of the Civil War, the contractors were compelled to give it up. The eastern portion of the line was curtailed June 30, 1861. The final chapter was closed when the latter part of the line was discontinued Aug. 1, 1861." Wells Fargo continued its stagecoach runs to mining camps in more northern locations until the coming of the US Transcontinental Railroad in 1869.

At least four battles of the American Civil War occurred at or near Butterfield mail posts, the Battle of Stanwix Station, the Battle of Picacho Pass, Second Battle of Mesilla and the Battle of Pea Ridge. Four clashes between the Apache and Confederate or Union forces in the Apache Wars occurred on the route, First Battle of Dragoon Springs, Second Battle of Dragoon Springs, the Battle of Apache Pass and Skirmish in Doubtful Canyon. Confederates attempted to keep the stations from Tucson to Mesilla open while they destroyed the stations from Tucson to Yuma which were used to supply the Union army as it advanced through Traditional Arizona. The burning of the Stanwix Station and others led to a significant delay to the Union advance, postponing the Fall of Tucson, Arizona's western Confederate capital, which housed one of two territorial courts; the other court was in Mesilla. All said engagements happened in the Confederate Arizona and Arkansas sectors of the mail route.

== Modern remnants ==
There are two surviving stage stations in San Diego County: Oak Grove Butterfield Stage Station in Oak Grove, California, and Warner's Ranch near Warner Springs, California. Both properties, 20 miles (32 km) apart, were declared National Historic Landmarks in 1961.

Elkhorn Tavern in Pea Ridge National Military Park was another destination along the route that was rebuilt after the Civil War. It is on one of the last sections of the trail that still exists: The segment of Old Wire Road running through Northwest Arkansas. Also in Arkansas is the town of Pottsville, which was built around Potts Inn. Potts Inn was finished in 1859 and was a popular stop along the route. It survives as a museum owned by the Pope County Historic Society.

When it was first established, the route proceeded due east from Franklin, Texas, toward Hueco Tanks; the remains of a stagecoach stop are still visible at the Hueco Tanks State Historic Site.

The summit of Guadalupe Peak in Guadalupe Mountains National Park features a stainless steel pyramid erected in 1958 to commemorate the 100th anniversary of the Butterfield Overland Mail, which passed south of the mountain.

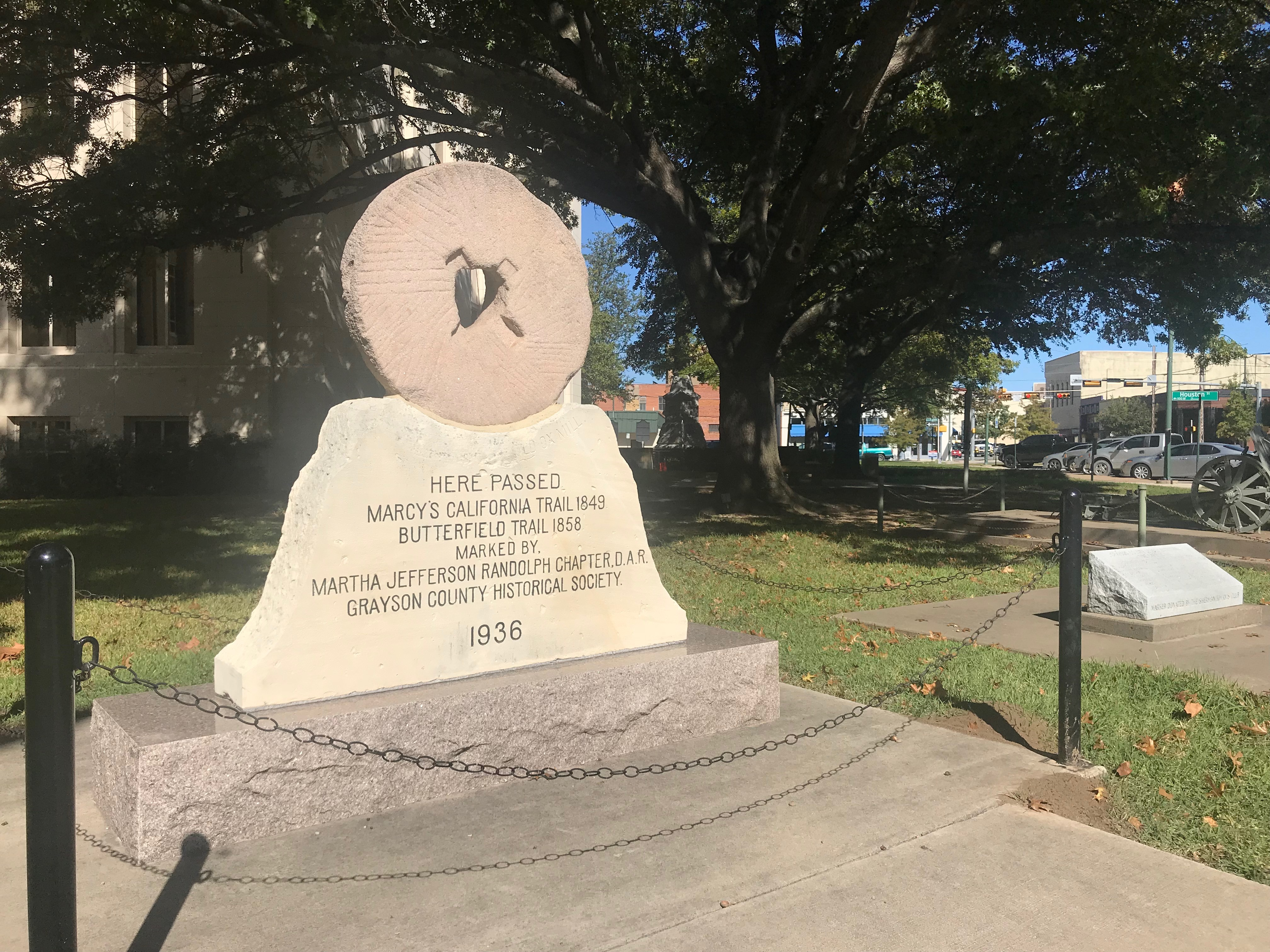
Butterfield marker in Sherman, Texas

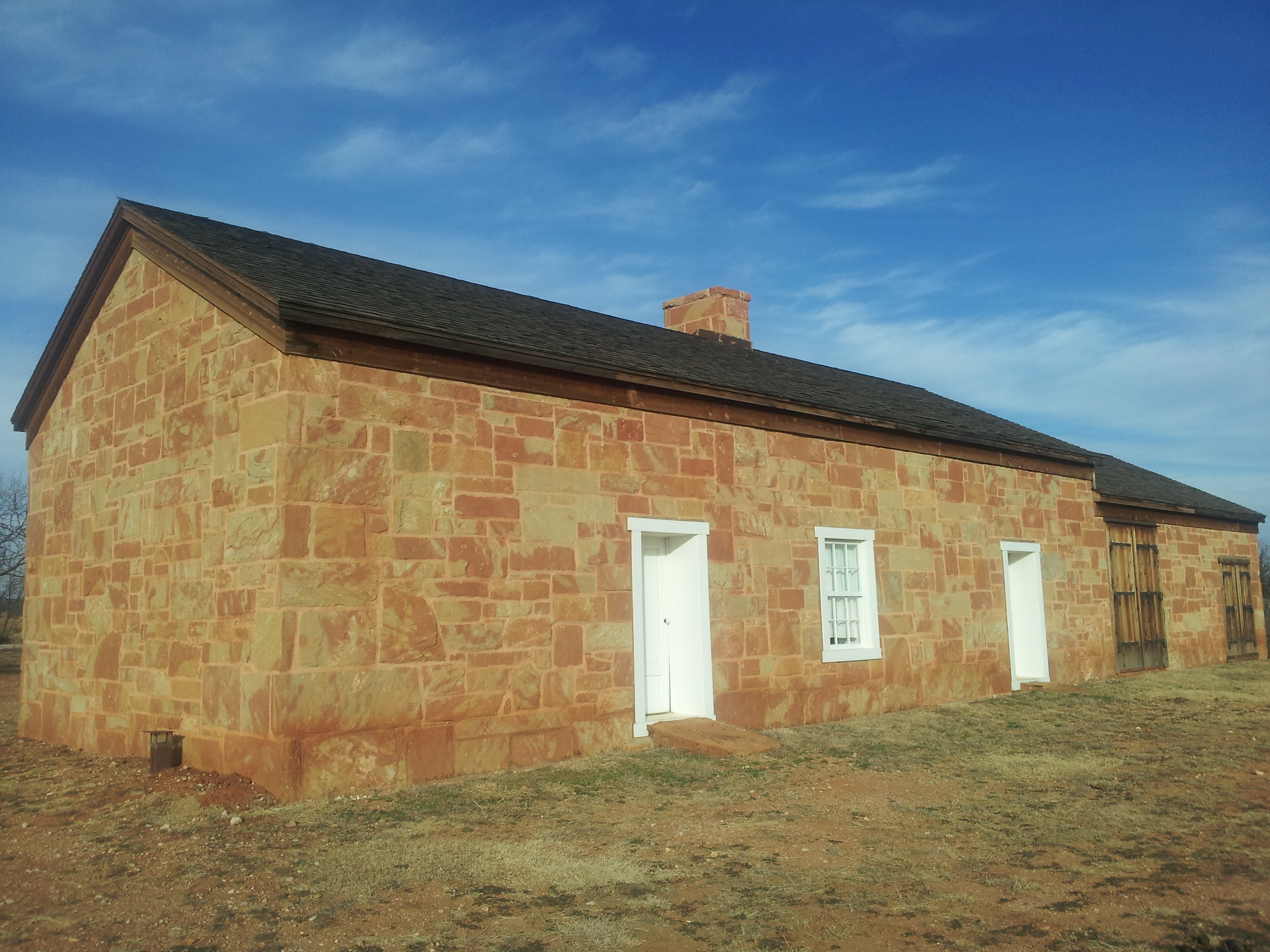
Fort Chadbourne reconstructed stage station

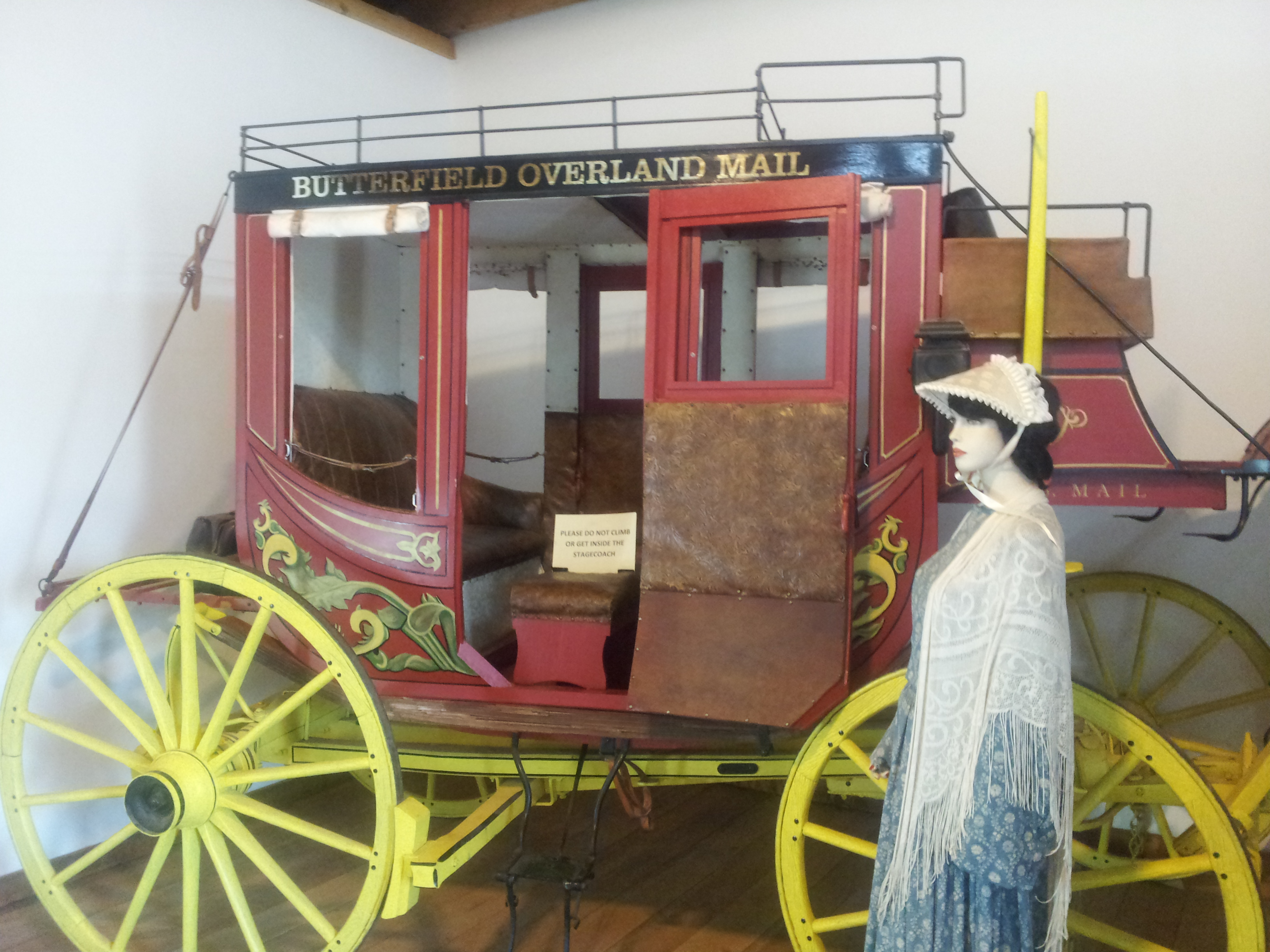
Fort Chadbourne museum

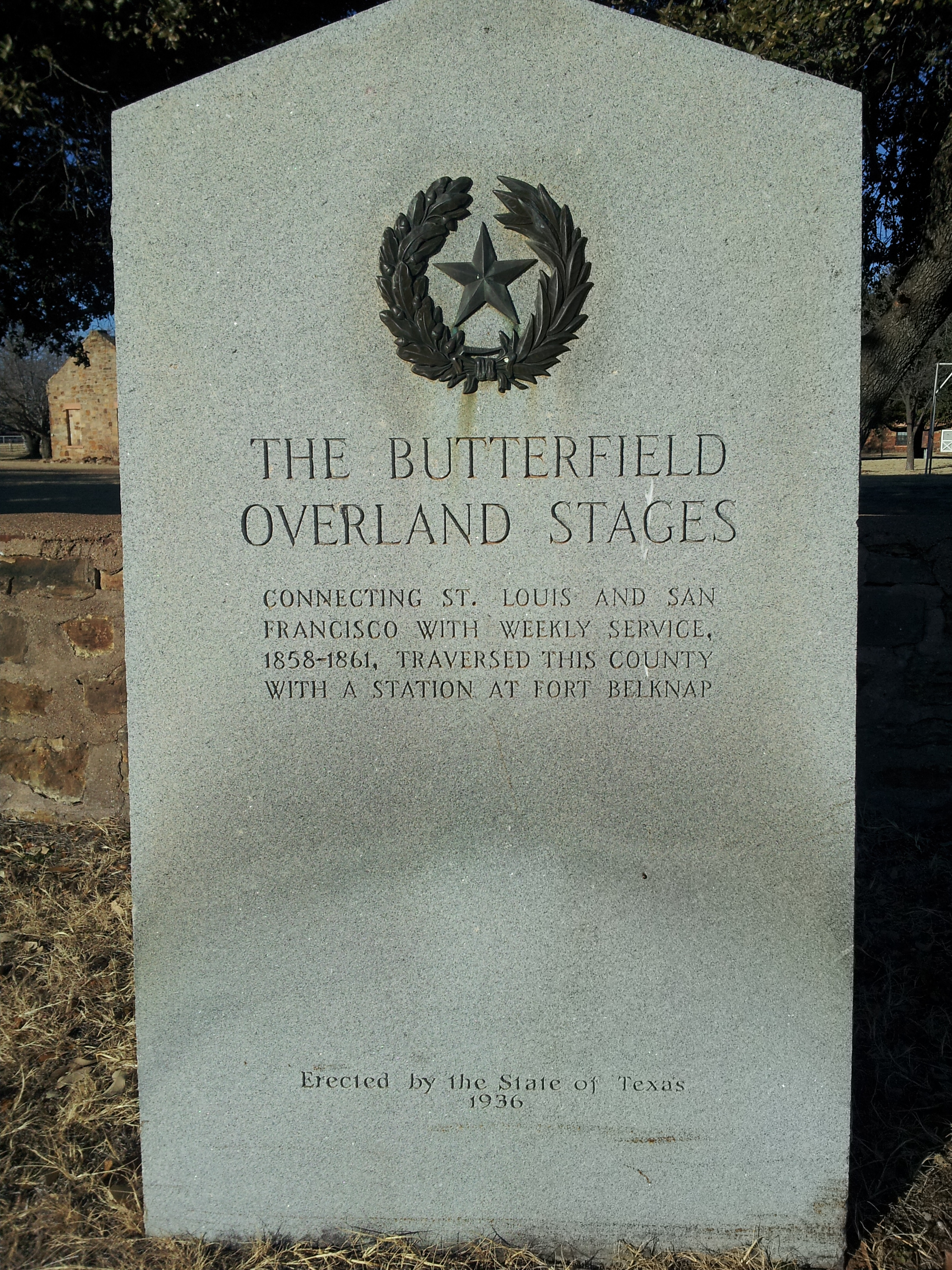
Fort Belknap (Texas) Historical Marker

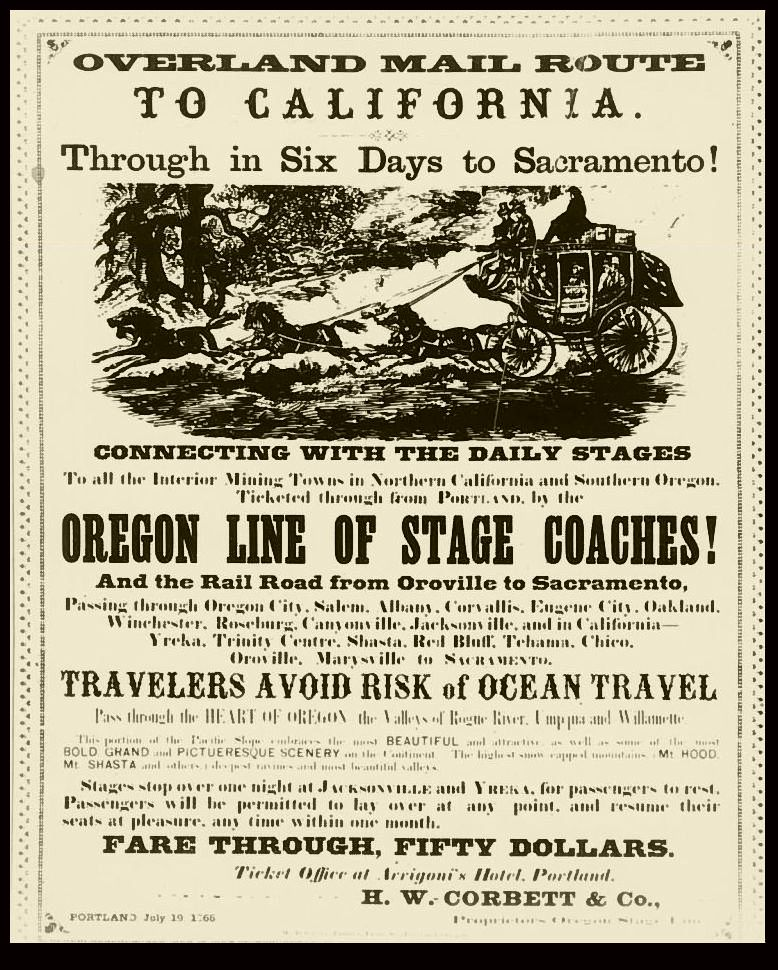
Advertising poster for a similar but later service between California and Oregon

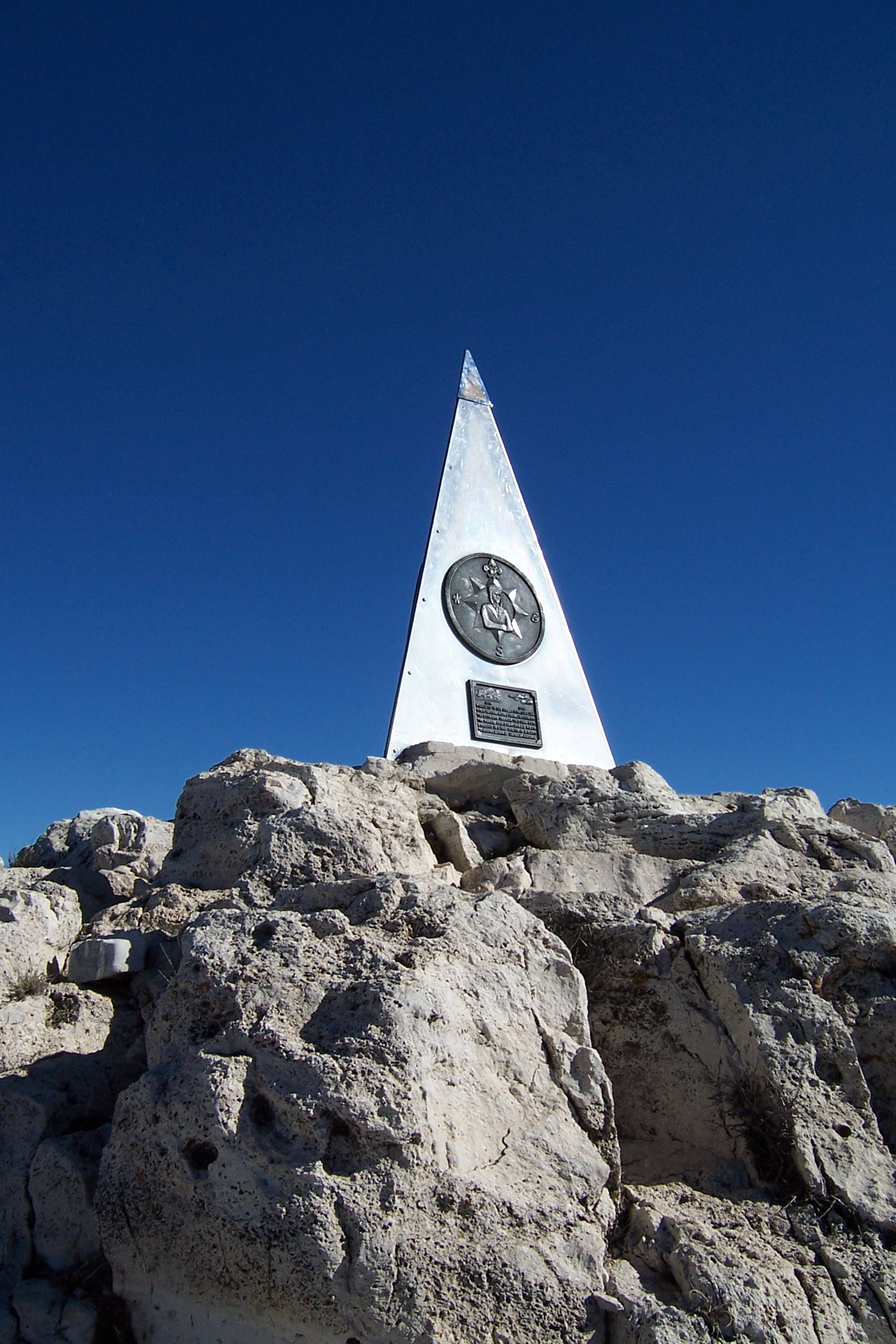
Guadalupe Peak summit, with a pyramid commemorating the 100th anniversary of the Butterfield Overland Mail

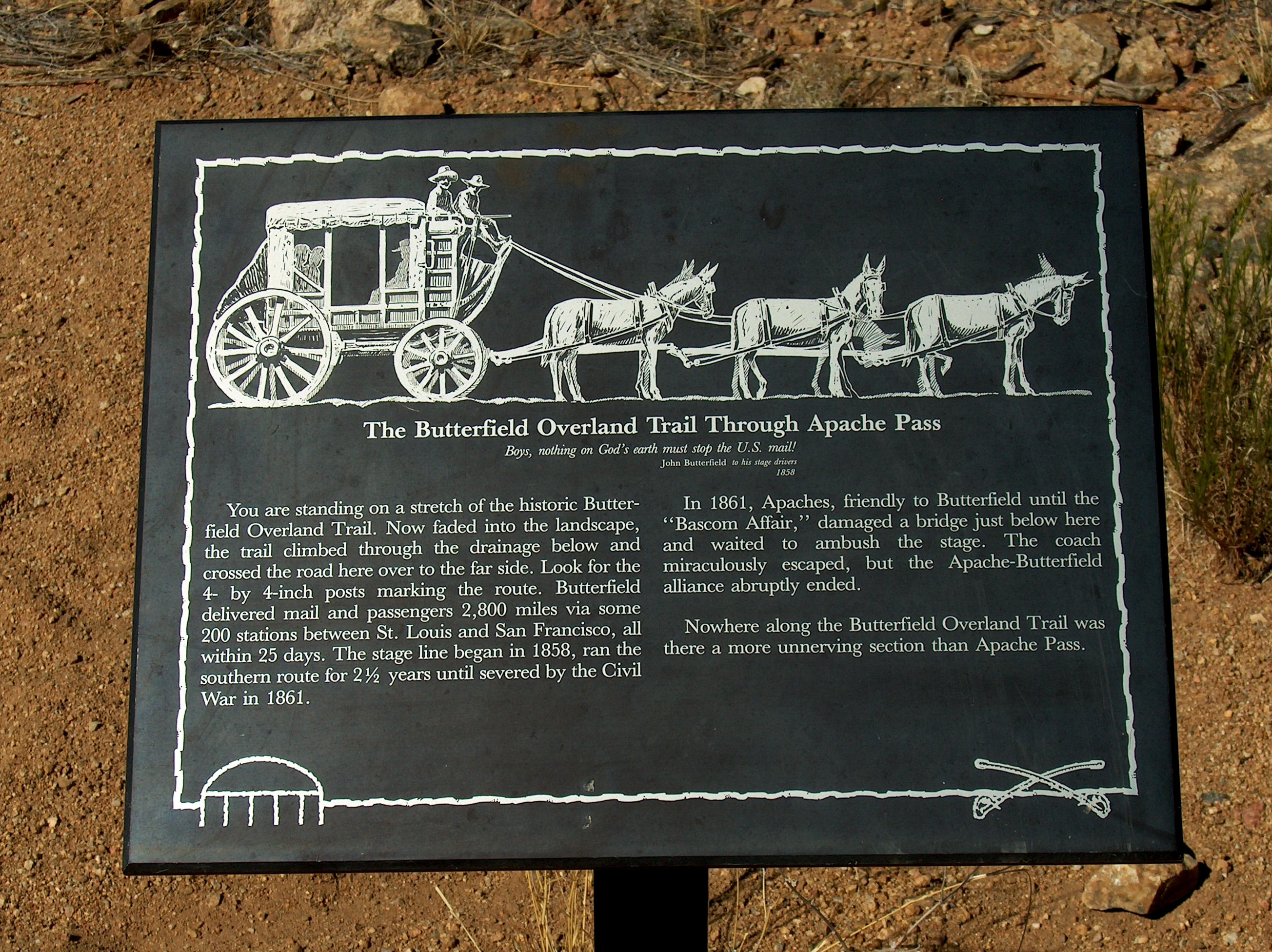
Butterfield historical marker at Apache Pass, Arizona

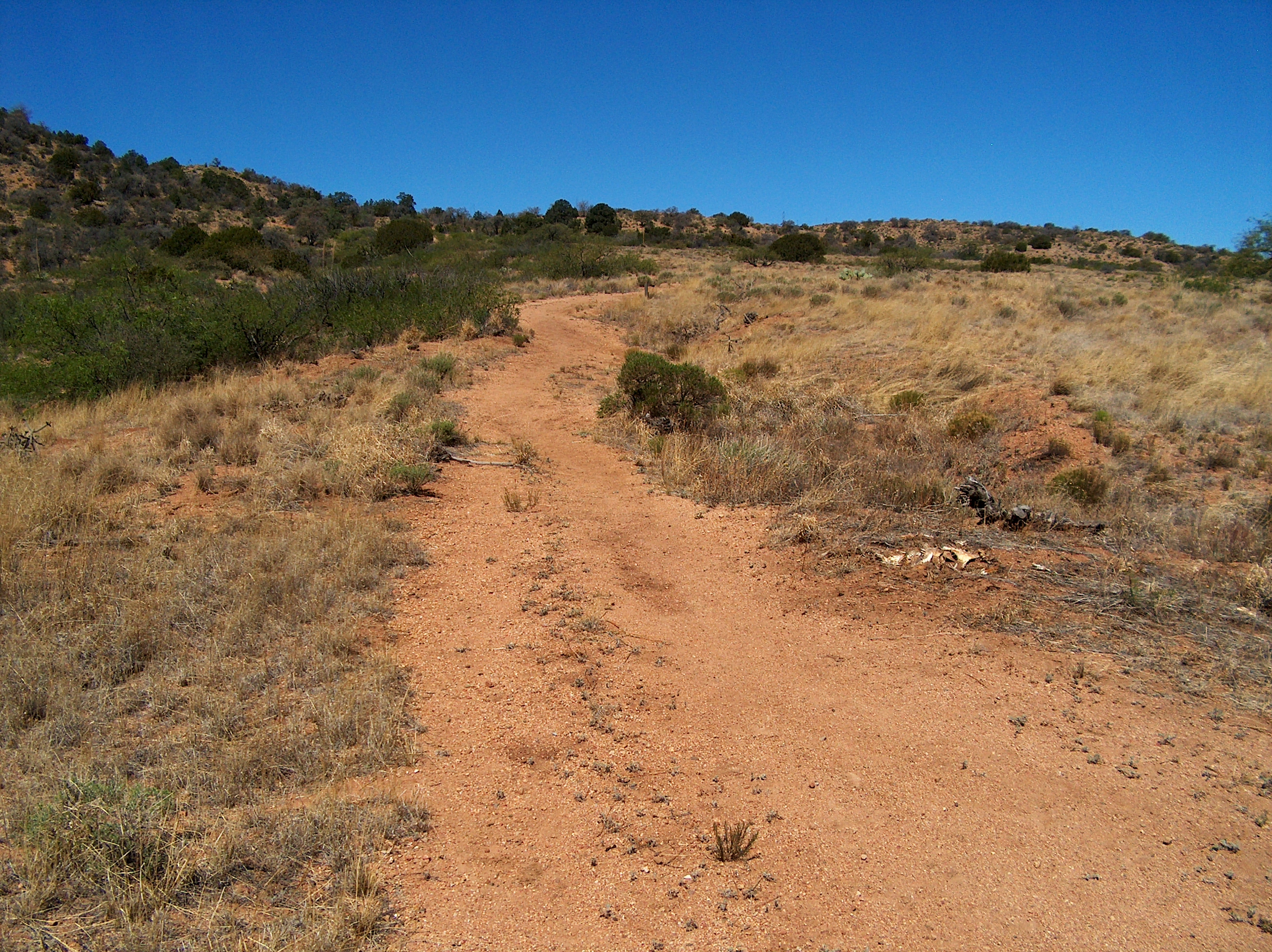
Butterfield Overland Mail trail remnant at Apache Pass, Arizona

== National historic trail ==
On March 30, 2009, President Barack Obama signed Congressional legislation (Sec. 7209 of P.L. 111-11) to conduct a study of designating the trail a National Historic Trail. The National Park Service concluded its Special Resource Study/Environmental Assessment in 2018 and determined that it would be feasible and desirable as part of the National Trails System.

Congress passed a bill designating the Butterfield Overland National Historic Trail in 2022. The trail covers 3,292 miles in eight states. The bill uniquely includes a provision specifying that the trail shall not hinder any energy transmission project. The Park Service will develop a comprehensive administration plan.

== In popular culture ==
In USA Film Culture, a Hollywood Tip Of The Hat was more than once given to the Overland Company in its films. The 51 film series dubbed The Three Mesquiteers of western movies offered a 1938 film named Overland Stage Raiders directed by George Sherman which at this time had Actor John Wayne playing one of the film's Three Mesquiteers heroes. This effort was soon followed by a 1939 released movie named Overland Mail (1939 film) wherein the film's lead role Actor Jack Randle portrays the heroic company rider. And this was followed by a 1942 released Western Serial of 15 short films, totaling about 280 minutes in length, which was also named Overland Mail (1942 film) wherein the serial's two heroes set out to find who was continually robbing their stagecoach company. A few years later, Actor Buster Crabbe led the cast of a 1946 released film named Overland Riders which began with a robbery attempt on a stagecoach, but alas this film bought to an end the Billy Carson series of hour long western films, and later in 1954, an admittedly railroad focused film named Overland Pacific appeared with the film's lead role hero, company railroad agent Jock Mahoney, riding to the rescue of the troubled railroad that he works for, via, what else, a stagecoach!

The Butterfield Overland Mail Company is featured in the 1957 film 3:10 to Yuma. The railroad was not completed through Arizona until 1879, eighteen years after Butterfield's Overland Mail Company ceased its service through Arizona. Also Butterfield never used his name on a stagecoach, only "Overland Mail Company."

The Butterfield Overland Mail Company is the main subject of the 1965 film Apache Uprising, featuring several main characters under the employ of Butterfield: District Manager, Station Agent, and Driver.

A Butterfield Overland stagecoach is also featured in the 2015 western film The Hateful Eight. The stagecoach in the movie was not representative of John Butterfield's stagecoaches as the movie fictionally represented the Central Overland Trail after the Civil War. John Butterfield never used his name on a stage; only "Overland Mail Company" and only operated on the Southern Overland Trail.

== See also ==
- Southern Emigrant Trail
- San Antonio-San Diego Mail Line
- Butterfield Overland Mail in California
  - Butterfield Overland Mail in Baja California
- Butterfield Overland Mail in New Mexico Territory
- Butterfield Overland Mail in Texas
- Butterfield Overland Mail in Indian Territory
- Butterfield Overland Mail in Arkansas and Missouri
- Butterfield Overland Despatch, an unrelated company
- Pony Express
- Postage stamps and postal history of the Confederate States
- Stockton – Los Angeles Road
- Apache Pass Station
- Butterfield Overland Mail Company Los Angeles Building

== Bibliography ==
- Ahnert, Gerald T., The Butterfield Trail and Overland Mail Company in Arizona, 1858–1861, Canastota Publishing, Co. Inc., Canastota, New York, 2011. This book is a comprehensive account of the Butterfield Trail in Arizona.
- Ahnert, Gerald T., The Cochise County Historical Journal, A Cochise County Historical Publication, Vol. 46 No. 1 – Spring/Summer 2016, 50th Anniversary Issue, All articles were by Gerald T. Ahnert concerning the history of Butterfield's Overland Mail Company.
- Ahnert, Gerald T., Butterfield Makes the Southern Overland Trail His Own, The Architects of the Butterfield Trail – Marquis L. Kenyon and John Butterfield Jr. add a Personal Touch to Arizona (Revised Edition 2017), NoBottomGulch Publications, Syracuse, NY.
- Hackler, George, The Butterfield Trail in New Mexico, Yucca Enterprises, 2005. This book is a comprehensive account of the Butterfield Trail in New Mexico.
- Ely, Glen Sample, The Texas Frontier and The Butterfield Overland Mail, 1858–1861, University of Oklahoma Press, 2016. This book is a comprehensive account of the Butterfield Trail in Texas.
- Smith, Waddell F., The Smoke Signal "The Pony Express – The Overland Mail," Spring 1968, No. 17, published by The Corral of the Westerners, Tucson, Arizona. Note: This article, by the grandson of one of the Pony Express owners, is an excellent study of the Overland Mail Company and Pony Express history.
- Richardson, Rupert N. Butterfield Overland Mail from the Handbook of Texas Online. Retrieved 2006-08-22.
- Root, Frank. The Overland Stage to California. Topeka, Kansas: W.Y. Morgan, 1901.
- Wright, Muriel H. "Historic Places on the Old Stage Line from Fort Smith to Red River – Appendix A", Chronicles of Oklahoma 11:2 (June 1933) 821–822 (accessed August 16, 2006).
- Hafen, L.R.R. (2004). The overland mail, 1849–1869: promoter of settlement precursor of railroads. Norman: University of Oklahoma Press.
- Butterfield, J., Fargo, W.G., & Holland, A. (1857). Letter to the postmaster general in relations to the overland mail to California.
- Butterfield, J.W. (1857). Skeleton map of the overland mail route to California. Route adopted by the department traced in green. Route proposed by John Butterfield and others (who were the lowest bidders) in red.
- Overland Mail Company, & Butterfield, J. (1858). Overland Mail Company: through time schedule between St. Louis, Mo., Memphis, Tenn. & San Francisco, Cal. [S.l: The Company?.
- Reed, M., & Pourade, R.F. (1966). The colorful Butterfield Overland Stage. Reproductions in color of 20 paintings by Marjorie Reed from the collection of James S. Copley. Palm Desert, Calif: Best-West Publications.
