= Tucson Cutoff =

Part of the American pioneer Southern Emigrant Trail

Coordinates: 32.3103°N 108.6110°W

The Tucson Cutoff was a significant change in the route of the Southern Emigrant Trail. It became generally known after a party of Forty-Niners led by Colonel John Coffee Hays followed a route suggested to him by a Mexican Army officer as a shorter route than Cooke's Wagon Road which passed farther south to cross the mountains to the San Pedro River at Guadalupe Pass.

== Route ==
The Tucson Cutoff ran from Ojo de Ynez on Cooke's Wagon Road on the southeast side of the Big Burro Mountains to the southwest to a spring and through a pass in the Pyramid Mountains south of today's Lordsburg. Descending to the southwest onto the playa in the north end of Animas Valley the cutoff route passed to the west through Stein's Pass, then southwest of its mouth to the Cienega of San Simon on the San Simon River. The cutoff then ran west through Puerto del Dado, from there it crossed the middle Sulphur Springs Valley and Willcox Playa to Croton Springs. From there it ran to Nugent’s Pass, down Tres Alamos Wash to the lower crossing of the San Pedro River near Tres Alamos. From Tres Alamos the route led southwest to a waterhole on Cooke's Wagon Road on Mescal Arroyo (just west of modern Mescal) where it linked up again with Cooke's route to Tucson.

== History ==
The Tucson Cutoff, also called variously "Puerto del Dado" Trail, Nugent's Wagon Road, later Apache Pass Trail, was long traveled by Spanish and Mexican soldiers and other travelers prior to 1830. It was first traveled by American fur trappers in the 1830s and was known but not used by Cooke for his wagon road. It became known to westward bound American travelers after it was first traveled by a party of 49ers led by John Coffee Hays in 1849. Notes about the Hays expedition aided the mapping of the route, lent to the commander of the Railroad Survey Expedition, by one of its members, John Nugent. In consequence the route was sometimes called Nugent's Wagon Road and also Nugent’s Pass and Nugent’s Springs on the route were given his name.

In the later 1850s the route of the stagecoach routes of the San Antonio-San Diego Mail Line and Butterfield Overland Mail, diverted from the Tucson Cutoff route, to a shorter route, found by the Railroad Survey Expedition, across the Sulphur Spring Valley via Ewell Spring, south of Wilcox Playa, to Dragoon Springs, in Dragoon Pass. It then ran down Dragoon Wash to the San Pedro River, then down river to the middle crossing of the San Pedro River (below the rail and highway bridges of modern Benson and south of Pomerene). However the Tucson Cutoff, better watered, continued in use as a wagon route between the San Pedro River and the Sulphur Springs Valley for decades afterward.
