= Nugent's Pass =

Mountain gap in Cochise County, Arizona

Nugents Pass
- Location within Arizona
- Elevation: 4,593 ft (1,400 m)

Location
- Location: Arizona; United States
- Coordinates: 32°11′00″N 110°06′02″W
- Topo map: USGS Steele Hills

Nugents Pass or Nugent's Pass is a gap at an elevation of 4,593 feet (1,400 m) in Cochise County, Arizona. The pass was named for John Nugent, who provided notes of his journey with a party of Forty-Niners across what became the Tucson Cutoff to Lt. John G. Parke, on expedition to identify a feasible railroad route from the Pima Villages to the Rio Grande.

== History ==
Nugent's Pass was an early alternate route of the Southern Emigrant Trail, called variously the Tucson Cutoff or "Puerto del Dado" Trail (later Apache Pass Trail). Long traveled by Spanish and Mexican soldiers and other early explorers, its first American travelers were likely fur trappers. The route became known to westward-bound American emigrants after it was traveled by a party of Forty-Niners led by John Coffee Hays in 1849.

The Tucson Cutoff ran from Cooke's Wagon Road on the east side of the Animas Valley west through Stein's Pass to the cienega on the nearby San Simon River; through Puerto del Dado to Dos Cabezas Spring; across the Sulphur Springs Valley and Willcox Playa to Croton Springs; through Nugent's Pass; down Tres Alamos Wash to the lower crossing of the San Pedro River near Tres Alamos; and finally southwest from Tres Alamos to a waterhole on Cooke's Wagon Road on Mescal Wash (just west of modern Mescal), where it linked up again with Cooke's route to Tucson.

In the later 1850s, the stagecoach routes of the San Antonio-San Diego Mail Line and Butterfield Overland Mail diverted from the Nugent's Pass route at Dos Cabezas Spring to a shorter route south of Willcox Playa, through Dragoon Pass to the middle crossing of the San Pedro River (below the rail and highway bridges of modern Benson and south of Pomerene). However, Nugent's Pass remained in use as a wagon route between the San Pedro River and the Sulphur Springs Valley for many decades afterward.
