= Croton Springs =

Springs in Cochise County, Arizona

Coordinates: 32°09′46″N 109°56′02″W

Croton Springs, formerly Nugent's Springs, are springs, in the Sulphur Springs Valley. It lies at an elevation of 4147 feet, located on the northwest edge of the Willcox Playa in Cochise County, Arizona.

== History ==
Croton Springs were historical watering places on several wagon roads through the Sulphur Springs Valley. It was a watering place from 1849 on the Tucson Cutoff between Cooke's Wagon Road in the Animas Valley and the waterhole on that road near Mescal, Arizona. That cutoff passed through Stein's Pass, Apache Pass, to Croton Springs across the Sulphur Springs Valley and Willcox Playa to the springs. From there it passed through Nugent’s Pass to the Lower Crossing of the San Pedro River below Tres Alamos and on the waterhole on Cooke's Wagon Road that had turned west to Tucson. Following the 1855 Railroad Survey expedition the spring was for a time called Nugent's Springs after John Nugent who gave his notes of the first journey across the Tucson Cutoff to aid the expedition.

By 1878 Croton Springs was 82 miles southeast of Fort Grant, 16 miles northeast of the Tucson-Fort Bowie-Dragoon Springs road crossing, (Fort Bowie was 37 miles east of this crossing, Tucson 65 miles west, Dragoon Springs 3 miles west southwest) and 71 miles southwest from Camp Goodwin.

Pumping water from the ground in the valley for irrigation has subsequently lowered the water-table in the valley, to the point where the springs no longer flow.
