= Southern Emigrant Trail =

19th-century immigrant route in the United States

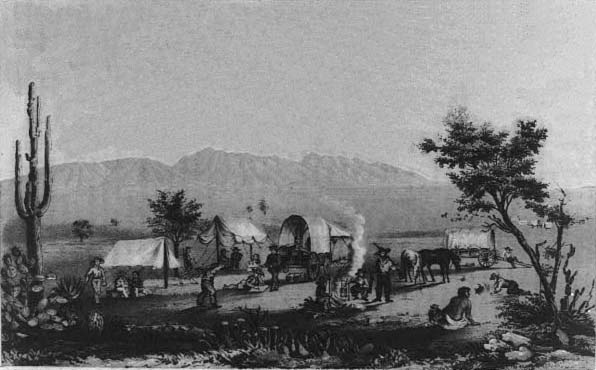
An American wagon train at Maricopa Wells in 1857

The Southern Emigrant Trail, also known as the Gila Trail, the Kearny Trail, the Southern Trail and the Butterfield Stage Trail, was a major overland route for immigration to California from the eastern United States that followed the Santa Fe Trail across the New Mexico Territory during the middle of the 19th century. Unlike the more northern routes, pioneer wagons could travel year-round, mountain passes not being blocked by snow; however, the southern route had the disadvantages of summer heat and a lack of water in the desert regions through which it passed, especially the Chihuahuan Desert in New Mexico and the Colorado Desert of California. Subsequently, it served as a route of travel and commerce between the Eastern and Western United States. The trail was closely followed by the San Antonio-San Diego Mail Line from 1857 to 1858 and then the Butterfield Overland Mail from 1858 to 1861.

== History of the route ==
=== 1846–1848: Kearny, Cooke, and Graham ===
In October 1846, General Stephen Watts Kearny and his dragoons, with their scout Kit Carson, found a route over the mountains from the El Camino Real de Tierra Adentro on the Rio Grande, via the Santa Rita mines to the Gila River, which Kearny's company then followed to the Colorado River at the Yuma Crossing, where they crossed the river and then the Colorado Desert to Southern California. This was known as the Gila Trail.

One month later, Colonel Philip St. George Cooke and the Mormon Battalion, traveling with wagons Kearny could not take across the mountains of New Mexico, followed a route south along the west bank of the Rio Grande from where Kearny had left the river, to a point just north of what later became the site of Fort Thorn. There Cooke left the Rio Grande, establishing a wagon road that reached far southwest through the Guadalupe Pass, then west just south of the current border with Mexico, then west to and beyond modern Agua Prieta, before turning northward via the San Pedro River, and finally west again to Tucson. Linking this route with the Sonora Road to California established by Juan Bautista de Anza in 1774, they marched on a three-day journey north over the desert before linking up with Kearny’s route on the Gila River just east of the Pima Villages. Cooke followed the Anza–Kearny route westward along the Gila to Yuma Crossing, where it had its junction with the El Camino del Diablo, an old Spanish route re-established by Mexico after 1828. This established the first southern wagon road from New Mexico to California. This new wagon route became known as Cooke's Road, or the Sonora Road, as much of the central part of the route passed through what was then the northern frontier of the state of Sonora, Mexico.

In 1848, a U.S. Army expedition of 1st Dragoons under Major Lawrence P. Graham marched from Chihuahua to California, through Janos, then westward to strike Cooke's road at Guadalupe Pass. Graham then followed Cooke's wagon route along the Mexican border region but went farther west beyond the San Pedro River along an older Spanish trail to the headwaters of the Santa Cruz River, which he followed to the Sonoran town of Santa Cruz before turning north on the old Spanish road to Tucson along the Santa Cruz River. Graham's detour, known as Major Graham's Road, would be taken by most of the Forty-niners following Cooke's route the next year, despite its greater distance.

From Yuma Crossing, the Southern Emigrant Trail crossed the Colorado Desert, dipping south along the Colorado River into Baja California, Mexico (avoiding the vast Algodones Dunes to the west and northwest, and following the waterholes along the Alamo and New Rivers), then northwest into California again across the desert to Carrizo Creek and the oasis at Vallecito.

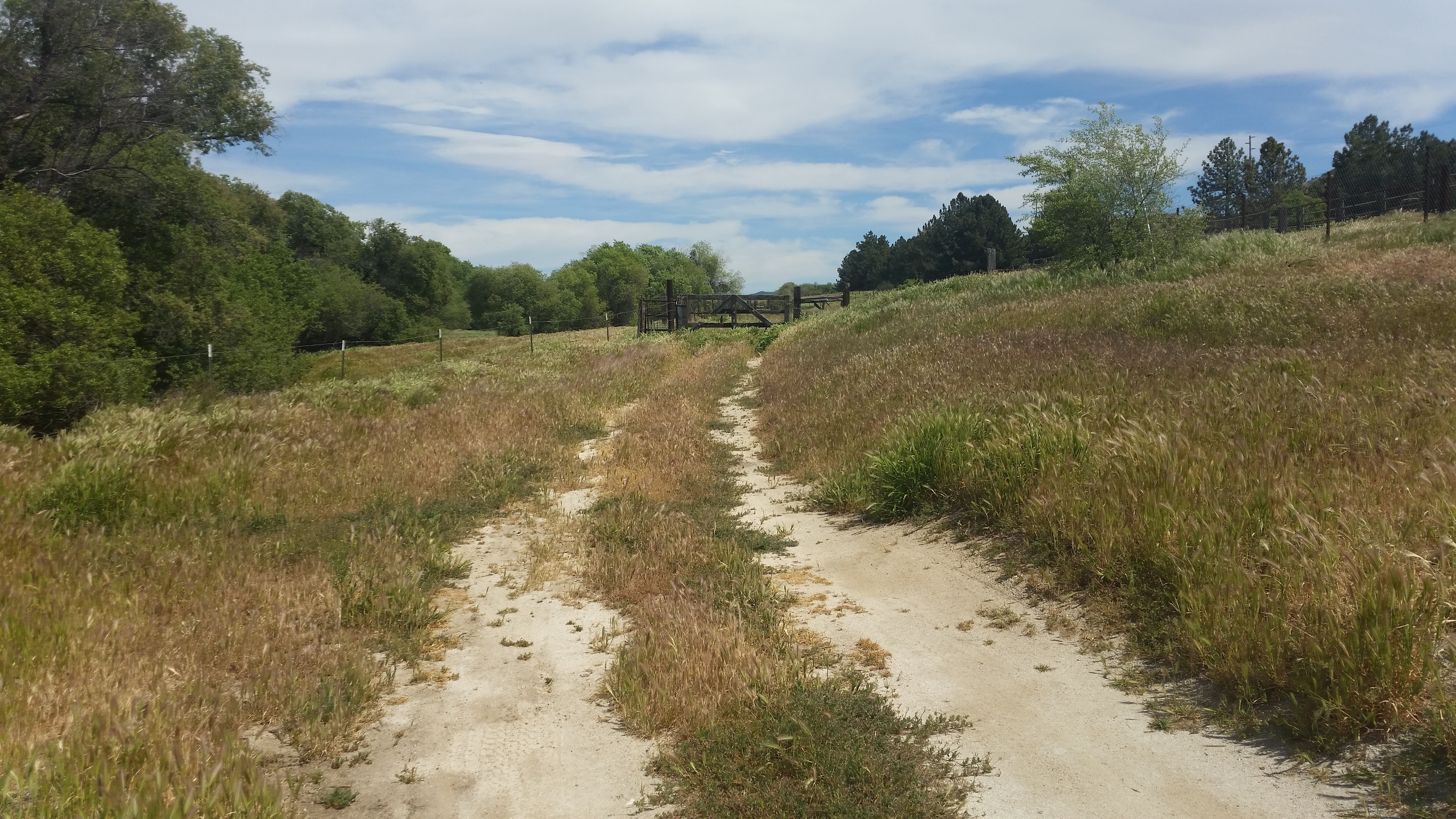
Remains of the Southern Emigrant Trail at Warner's Ranch in 2017

From Vallecito, the trail then ran northwest into the Peninsular Ranges crossing Warners Pass to Warner's Ranch. From Warner's Ranch the road then ran either northwest to Los Angeles (via Temecula, La Laguna, Temescal, Chino, La Puente and San Gabriel) or west-southwest to San Diego via Santa Ysabel, San Pasqual and Rancho Peñasquitos. From either of these towns the traveler could continue north by land to the gold fields on the coast via the El Camino Real or over the old Tejon Pass into the San Joaquin Valley and then north by what would later become the Stockton–Los Angeles Road or via the El Camino Viejo. Alternatively, they could take ships to San Francisco from San Diego or San Pedro.

=== 1849–1854: Tucson Cutoff ===
Subsequently, the distance of the Cooke–Graham route was drastically shortened by the Tucson Cutoff, pioneered by John Coffee Hays with a party of forty-niners in late 1849. This route avoided the long distance traveled to the south by passing through Stein's Pass, Apache Pass and Nugent’s Pass, then down Tres Alamos Wash to the Lower Crossing of the San Pedro River below Tres Alamos. From there it linked up with Cooke's Wagon Road at a waterhole, near modern Mescal.

=== 1855 to the 1880s: Dragoon Pass, Pacific Wagon Road, Doubtful Canyon Cutoff ===
==== Dragoon Pass and the Pacific Wagon Road ====
In 1856, a Railroad Survey Expedition modified the Tucson Cutoff route, passing south of Nugent's Pass using Dragoon Pass and the Middle Crossing or San Pedro Crossing of the river instead of the Lower Crossing below Los Alamos.

In 1857, following the Gadsden Purchase, as part of the Pacific Wagon Road, a military road being built between El Paso and Fort Yuma, a wagon road was built from Mesilla westward to Cooke's Spring, saving the longer route via the San Diego Crossing. The Pacific Wagon Road then followed Cooke's Wagon Road and the Tucson Cutoff as far as the west side of the Apache Pass. There it made another shortcut across Sulphur Springs Valley to Dragoon Pass, and then down Dragoon Wash to the San Pedro River. The route then descended northward on the right bank of the river to the Middle Crossing of the San Pedro River. From this crossing the Pacific Wagon Road ran due west to link up again with Cooke's Wagon Road at Mescal Springs to continue on to Tucson, then turned northward to the Pima Villages and Maricopa Wells, where it turned westward along the Gila River following it to the ferries on the Colorado River across from Fort Yuma. The Pacific Wagon Road shortened the route still further for travelers.

==== Doubtful Canyon Cutoff ====
From 1859 to 1861, during the time of the Butterfield Overland Mail, the stages and other traffic ran over a shortcut between Ojo de Vaca and Apache Pass, over the Peloncillo Mountains through Doubtful Canyon. However, following the destruction of stage stations and coaches and the killing of their keepers and drivers at the outbreak of war with the Apache in 1861, this route was abandoned. Favored ambush country, the shortcut was unwise to use unless the travelers were a strong detachment of soldiers or under military escort by one. Even so, in May 1864, California Volunteers fought a Skirmish in Doubtful Canyon with Apache that tried to ambush them there. Traffic returned to the Pacific Wagon Road route, which then remained a primary east–west route in the Southwestern United States until the first railroads were built through the region in the 1880s.
