= John Nugent =

John Nugent may refer to:

- John Nugent (journalist) (1821–1880), American journalist and agent of United States President James Buchanan
- John F. Nugent (1868–1931), American politician, United States Senator from Idaho
- John Cullen Nugent (1921–2014), Canadian sculptor
- John Nugent Fitch (1840–1927), British botanical illustrator
- John Nugent (footballer), English-born footballer for Notts County
- John Dillon Nugent (1869–1940), Irish nationalist politician
- John Valentine Nugent (1796–1874), Irish-born educator, journalist and political figure in Newfoundland
- John Nugent, 5th Earl of Westmeath (1671–1754), Irish nobleman and soldier
- John P. Nugent, American labor organizer and politician from New York
- J. C. Nugent (John Charles Nugent, 1868–1947), American actor, director, and screenwriter
