= Nugent (surname) =

Nugent is an Anglo-Irish surname, of Norman French origin.

Those bearing it include:

== Arts and entertainment ==
- Beth Nugent (born c.1958), American writer and academic
- Edward J. Nugent (1904–1995), American actor
- Elliott Nugent (1896–1980), American filmmaker
- Geoff Nugent, the real name of Australian comedian Jim Jefferies (born 1977)
- Jay Nugent (born 1972), American musician
- Nelle Nugent (born 1939), American theater producer
- Pete Nugent (1909–1973), American tap dancer
- Richard Bruce Nugent (1906–1987), American writer
- Rodney Nugent (born 1957), American actor & writer
- Ted Nugent (born 1948), American musician

== Military ==
- Sir George Nugent, 1st Baronet (1757–1849), British soldier & colonial governor
- Laval Nugent von Westmeath (1777–1862), Irish-born Austrian soldier
- Richard E. Nugent (1902–1979), USAF general
- Robert Nugent (officer) Irish-American infantry officer
- William Nugent (soldier) (died 1690), Irish soldier

== Politics ==
- James E. Nugent (1922-2016), American politician
- John Nugent (journalist) (1821–1880), American journalist and quasi-diplomat
- John F. Nugent (1868–1931), American politician
- Kate Nugent, American politician
- Kieran Nugent (1958–2000), Northern Ireland activist
- Peter Nugent (1938–2001), Australian politician
- Rich Nugent (born 1951), American politician and sheriff
- Richard Nugent, Baron Nugent of Guildford (1907–1994), British politician
- Robert Nugent, 1st Earl Nugent (1709–1788), Irish politician and poet

== Science ==
- Carrie Nugent (born 1984), American physicist & science communicator
- Daniel Nugent (1954-1997), American anthropologist
- Keith Nugent (born 1959), Australian physicist
- Rebecca Nugent, American statistician, data scientist, and statistics educator

== Sport ==
=== Association football ===
- Cliff Nugent (1929-2018), English footballer
- David Nugent (born 1985), English footballer
- John Nugent (footballer) (fl. 1904), English footballer
- Kevin Nugent (footballer) (born 1969), English footballer
- Mike Nugent (soccer) (born 1980), American soccer player

=== Other sports ===
- Ackera Nugent (born 2002), Jamaican hurdler
- Andrea Nugent (born 1968), Canadian swimmer
- Bob Nugent (1915–1995), American basketball player
- Kevin Nugent (ice hockey) (born 1955), American ice hockey play
- Michael Nugent (Australian footballer) (born 1959), Australian rules footballer
- Mike Nugent (born 1982), American football placekicker
- Mike Nugent (athlete) (1946–2024), Australian Paralympian
- Ryan Nugent-Hopkins (born 1993), Canadian ice hockey player
- Tom Nugent (1913–2006), American football coach

== Other people ==
- Helen Nugent (born 1949), Australian businesswoman and academic
- James Nugent (priest) (1822–1905), British religious leader
- Michael Nugent (born 1961), Irish writer, advocate of atheism
- Patrick John Nugent (born 1943), first husband of Luci Baines Johnson
- Robert Nugent (priest) (1937-2014), American Roman Catholic priest and co-founder of New Ways Ministry
