= Tres Alamos Wash =

Landform in Cochise County, Arizona

Tres Alamos Wash, an ephemeral stream tributary to the San Pedro River, in Cochise County, Arizona. It runs southwesterly to meet the San Pedro River, across the river from the former settlement of Tres Alamos, Arizona. Tres Alamos Wash passes east and northeastward between the Little Dragoon Mountains and Johnny Lyon Hills to where it arises in a valley east of those heights and west of Allen Flat and the Steele Hills. It has its source at 32°07′45″N 110°02′59″W.

== History ==
Tres Alamos Wash, was part of the route of a 19th-century wagon road, called the Tucson Cutoff between Nugent’s Pass and the San Pedro River.
