= Bowie, Arizona =

Unincorporated community in the state of Arizona, United States

- Census designated place
- Location of Bowie in Cochise County, Arizona.

- Location of Bowie in Arizona
- Coordinates: 32°19′32″N 109°29′43″W
- Country: United States
- State: Arizona
- County: Cochise

Area
  - Total: 1.71 sq mi (4.42 km^{2})
  - Land: 1.71 sq mi (4.42 km^{2})
  - Water: 0 sq mi (0.00 km^{2})
- Elevation: 3,763 ft (1,147 m)

Population (2020)
  - Total: 406
  - Density: 238.0/sq mi (91.89/km^{2})
- Time zone: UTC-7 (Mountain (MST))
  - Summer (DST): UTC-7 (MST)
- ZIP codes: 85605
- Area code: 520
- FIPS code: 04-07380
- GNIS feature ID: 2582739

Bowie is an unincorporated community and a census-designated place in Cochise County, Arizona, United States. As of the 2020 census, the population of Bowie was 406.

== History ==
The Southern Pacific built a rail line through eastern Arizona in 1880, including a stop at Bowie. Once a junction was made in March 1881 with eastern rail lines in Deming, New Mexico, this line was the second transcontinental rail route across the United States.

The community is named for the former Fort Bowie.

== Demographics ==
Historical population
Census	Pop.	Note	%±
1910	546		—
1920	885		62.1%
1930	609		−31.2%
1960	650		—
2010	449		—
2020	406		−9.6%
U.S. Decennial Census

Bowie first appeared on the 1910 U.S. Census as the "Bowie Precinct" of Cochise County. It appeared again in 1920 and 1930 as a precinct. It reported a majority White population in 1930. The population of Bowie was 650 in the 1960 census. 2010, when it was made a census-designated place (CDP).

== Location and nearby communities ==
The community lies on Interstate 10 in eastern Arizona close to the western New Mexico border. The community is in the west of the San Simon Valley, as well as the northeast foothills of the Dos Cabezas Mountains. On Interstate 10, Willcox, Arizona at the Willcox Playa lies west-southwest; San Simon, AZ and Road Forks-Lordsburg, New Mexico lie east.

== Information ==
Bowie has the ZIP Code of 85605; according to the 2020–2024 American Community Survey 5-year estimates, ZIP Code Tabulation Area (ZCTA) 85605 had a population of 683.

== Climate ==
Bowie has a borderline semi-arid/desert climate (Köppen BSk/BWk/BSh/BWh) with very hot summers punctuated by monsoon rains, and mild, generally dry winters with cold nights. Typically there are 26.9 days topping 100 °F or 37.8 °C and 119 days over 90 °F or 32.2 °C, which only a few days with unusually heavy rain failing to top this mark during the summer. In the winter, there are typically 63.6 nights falling below freezing, with the all-time record low being 3 °F (−16.1 °C) on December 9, 1978 – though the dryness means only one day every three or four winters will fail to top freezing, and only 6.4 days per winter will not top 50 °F or 10 °C. The average snowfall is 2.6 inches or 0.07 metres, but the median is zero so that most winters do not have measurable falls, though 8.7 inches (0.22 m) fell in January 1978.

Since 1899 the wettest calendar year has been 1914 with 19.96 inches (507.0 mm) and the driest 1956 with 3.01 inches (76.5 mm), whilst the wettest month has been July 1919 with 6.38 inches (162.1 mm), and the wettest day October 30, 1951, with 2.75 inches (69.9 mm).

Climate data for Bowie, Arizona (1981-2010; extremes 1899-2001)
Month	Jan	Feb	Mar	Apr	May	Jun	Jul	Aug	Sep	Oct	Nov	Dec	Year
Record high °F (°C)	83 (28)	88 (31)	98 (37)	99 (37)	110 (43)	115 (46)	116 (47)	110 (43)	110 (43)	105 (41)	96 (36)	80 (27)	116 (47)
Mean daily maximum °F (°C)	61.0 (16.1)	65.6 (18.7)	72.1 (22.3)	80.3 (26.8)	89.1 (31.7)	97.5 (36.4)	97.2 (36.2)	94.1 (34.5)	90.6 (32.6)	80.9 (27.2)	69.5 (20.8)	60.5 (15.8)	79.9 (26.6)
Mean daily minimum °F (°C)	30.8 (−0.7)	34.3 (1.3)	38.3 (3.5)	44.8 (7.1)	52.9 (11.6)	61.7 (16.5)	66.7 (19.3)	65.5 (18.6)	59.3 (15.2)	48.0 (8.9)	36.5 (2.5)	30.3 (−0.9)	47.6 (8.7)
Record low °F (°C)	4 (−16)	9 (−13)	14 (−10)	22 (−6)	28 (−2)	36 (2)	49 (9)	44 (7)	30 (−1)	24 (−4)	15 (−9)	3 (−16)	3 (−16)
Average rainfall inches (mm)	1.02 (26)	0.84 (21)	0.66 (17)	0.27 (6.9)	0.41 (10)	0.49 (12)	2.02 (51)	2.22 (56)	1.04 (26)	1.35 (34)	0.76 (19)	1.26 (32)	12.34 (310.9)
Average rainy days (≥ 0.01 inch)	5.4	5.1	4.2	2.0	2.5	2.7	9.3	9.2	5.3	4.9	3.4	4.8	58.8
Source: National Oceanic and Atmospheric Administration

== In popular culture ==
Bowie has become known as the hometown of the fictional character John Rambo. This was first revealed in Rambo: First Blood Part II and later elaborated on in Rambo III. The 2008 film Rambo was the first in the series to include scenes set in Bowie, although they were actually filmed in California. The 2019 film Rambo: Last Blood takes place in Bowie and Mexico, although it was once again filmed elsewhere.
