= Fosters Hole =

Waterhole on the Cooke's Wagon Road in New Mexico

Coordinates: 32°41′45″N 107°24′56″W

Fosters Hole or La Tinaja, was a waterhole on the original route of Cooke's Wagon Road in what is now Sierra County, New Mexico. It is located in narrow crevasse at the foot of a cliff in Jug Canyon that is difficult to spot, except from a few vantage points.

== Discovery by Cooke's Expedition ==
Lt. Colonel Philip St. George Cooke described Fosters Hole in his 1849 official journal of the expedition of his Mormon Battalion, from Santa Fe to San Diego in 1846-47:

November 9.—Leroux came back last evening; he went down about fifty miles, struck off where the river turns east at San Diego, and in fifteen miles found some water holes; then he saw from a high hill a creek running out of the mountain at an estimated distance of thirty miles; the next water, over a rather level plain.

November 13.— After following the river this morning a mile or more, we found a pole and note from Mr. Leroux, but met at the same time two of the guides, who directed us to leave the river short to the right, stating it was fifteen miles to water. I followed a smooth inclined plane (between two bluffs,) three miles, and then had a steep ascent; then following ridges and making ascents occasionally, we reached another inclined bed of a rainy-weather stream. From this we wound up a long valley to a ridge which bound it, following that over a very rocky prairie. Charboneaux had gone to the head of the inclined plane, and found, he thought, an outlet. The water is at its head; but he did not return in time to direct all the wagons, and it is doubtful with me if it would have been better. The wagons arrived at this ground about an hour by sun, having come fifteen or sixteen miles, and all up-hill; the prairie being usually gravelly, and not rough. The water is about 100 feet lower than the camp, in a rocky chasm, difficult of descent for animals. The chief supply is a natural rock-bound well, thirty feet in diameter, and twenty four feet deep. It contains about 55,000 gallons. Many feet below it are two smaller holes, which the animals can get at two or three at a time. There is no fuel, save a few bushes and Spanish bayonets. The country is well covered to-day with gamma grass, and, also, I saw buffalo grass. We came over a high point, and had a fine view of the Organos and "El Paso" mountains, and the mound called "San Diego," where the river turns to the east. For a road coming up the river, there is a very fine valley, gradually ascending to this point. The course to-day, allowing for a variation of the needle of 12° E., was S. W. Some antelopes were seen.

St. George Cooke described Fosters Hole in his later book:

November 9th.— ... Mr. Leroux returned; he had left the river where it turned eastward opposite San Diego, and had found a water hole fifteen miles on our course, and seen a prairie stream about thirty miles beyond.

November 13th.— A mile or two from camp a note from Leroux was found on a pole, but also two return guides were met, who directed the march short to the right; and a march of fifteen miles was made in a south-west course, always ascending over gravelly prairie, uneven but not very difficult; and then, in a rocky chasm a hundred feet deep, a natural well or reservoir of pure water was found. There was no fuel, save a few bushes and Spanish bayonet, but the country was well covered with grama and buffalo grass.

The Mormon battalion was left fifteen miles west of the Rio Grande, in camp near a deep ravine in which was a natural well of rock, which the sagacity of the guides had discovered, to make their first venture in the desert a success. This was November the 13th, 1846.

== Fosters Hole named, and its use ==
This natural well was later named Fosters Hole, for Stephen Clark Foster, the translator for the expeditions officers, who found it. Its name and location appear in a sketch map adjunct to W.H. Emory's main map of the route of the Army of the West under Kearny across the southwest to California.

Subsequent to Cooke's expedition, Forty-niners and later travelers used the route proposed by him, from the Jornada del Muerto across San Diego Crossing then 17 miles to a camp on the river with a cutoff to his route near the future site of Fort Thorn. From there it was then 8 miles up a dry arroyo then 4 miles on rolling hills to "the water" (Fosters Hole).

Benjamin Ignatius Hayes, coming down the Rio Grande from the north described Fosters Hole when he camped there on his way to California in November, 1849:
"Tuesday, 20th: In about 12 miles the appearance of the country strongly indicated that we were soon to bid farewell to the river. At several points plain wagon tracks Seemed to lead off. At length we made a turn toward the hills, hardly perceiving our destination at first, winding up a long cañon of gentle ascent, in general; descending again into a wide bottom; thence over a rolling country covered with grana, and at the end of 24 miles from the morning's camp we entered a little cove to the right of the road, where Capt. C. had already found water; abundant grass on the hillsides; fuel, a little mezquite and stalks of the Spanish bayonet. This is "Foster's Hole," described by Col. Cooke as "a natural rock-bound wall, thirty feet in diameter and twenty-four feet deep, containing about 55,000 gallons of clear, pure water."

"From our camp it can be approached through a narrow opening in the rocks, but the mules are driven over the hills on either side down into the chasm, where they can be watered one or two at a time in two small basins at the foot of the main one, some 15 or 20 feet below it. The process is a long one but easy enough. We had also found abundant water in a large pond on the roadside, three miles from the river. Day clear and pleasant. Our camp was Within a mile of the table-land that stretches, almost without interruption a level plain, to Guadalupe Pass. Ascending from the river, the mountain scenery is various, striking, and grand, comprehending a view of the Organos and El Paso mountains. The river here runs off short to the east, while the emigrant road takes nearly an opposite direction."

From Fosters Hole it was 10 miles onward to Mule Spring or Mule Creek, and 12 miles more to Cooke's Spring on what had become known as Cooke's Wagon Road. In 1853, Fort Thorn was built between where the roads left the Rio Grande for Fosters Hole, and the town of Santa Barbara was built nearby southeast of the fort.

== Subsequent Decrease in Use, Abandoned and Forgotten ==
When a shortcut was built between the crossing of the Rio Grande at Mesilla and Cooke's Spring, as part of the Pacific Wagon Road military road construction project in 1856, wagon traffic soon diminished on the longer route by way of San Diego Crossing. In Marcy's, The Prairie Traveler (1858), his ITINERARY XXIII, From Fort Thorne, New Mexico, to Fort Yuma, California; gives the distance to "Water Holes" from Fort Thorn as 14.3 miles, "One mile west of hole in rock. Water uncertain; no wood."

Fort Thorn had been abandoned in 1859 and by 1861 at the beginning of the American Civil War Santa Barbara, and other settlements in the area had been driven away by the start of the Chiricahua Wars removing locals (except the Apache) with knowledge of the Fosters Hole. In 1862 the California Column account of the route to Fort Thorn from Cooke's Spring, omit mention of Fosters Hole or any water source after Mule Spring on the 22 mile route between Mule Spring and the head of Cooke's Wagon Road on the Rio Grande. The location of Forsters Hole, was lost until it was rediscovered in 1988, in Jug Canyon, on a ranch west of Hatch, New Mexico. The owner of the ranch was unaware of its existence.
