= Guadalupe Pass =

Guadalupe Pass may mean:

A mountain pass:

- Guadalupe Pass (Texas) in Culberson County, Texas.
- Guadalupe Pass (New Mexico) in Hidalgo County, New Mexico
