= Steele Hills =

Ridge in Cochise County, Arizona, US

Coordinates: 31°11′06″N 110°01′16″W

Steele Hills, are a ridge of hills, east of the Tres Alamos Wash valley and the Sulphur Springs Valley in Cochise County, Arizona.
