= 1861 United States Senate election in California =

- March 9–20, 1861 (1st–22nd); April 2, 1861 (23rd)

113 members of the California State Legislature 57 votes needed to win
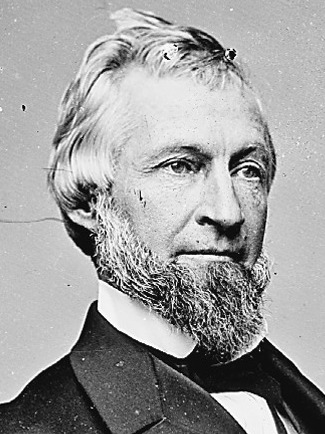

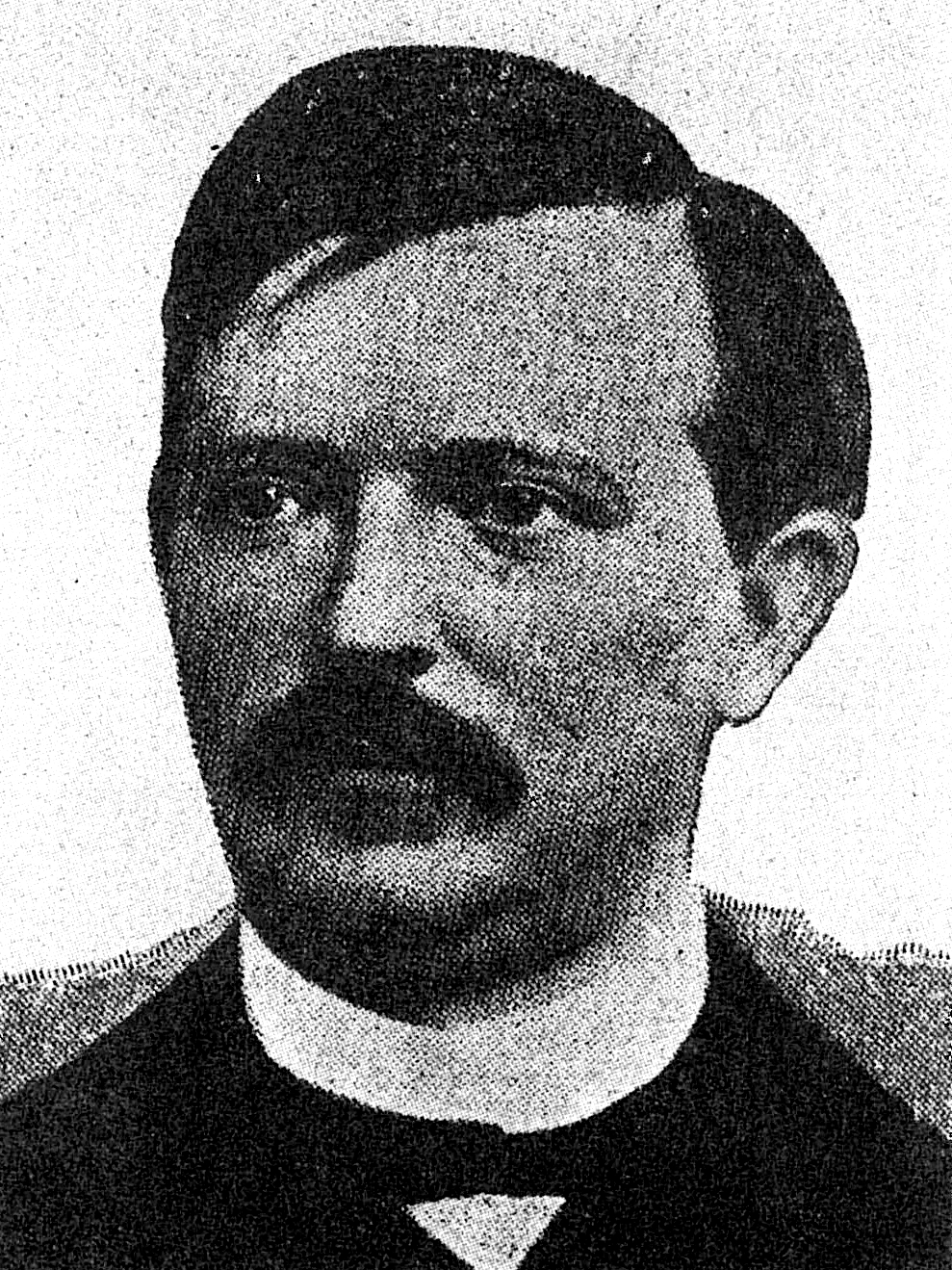

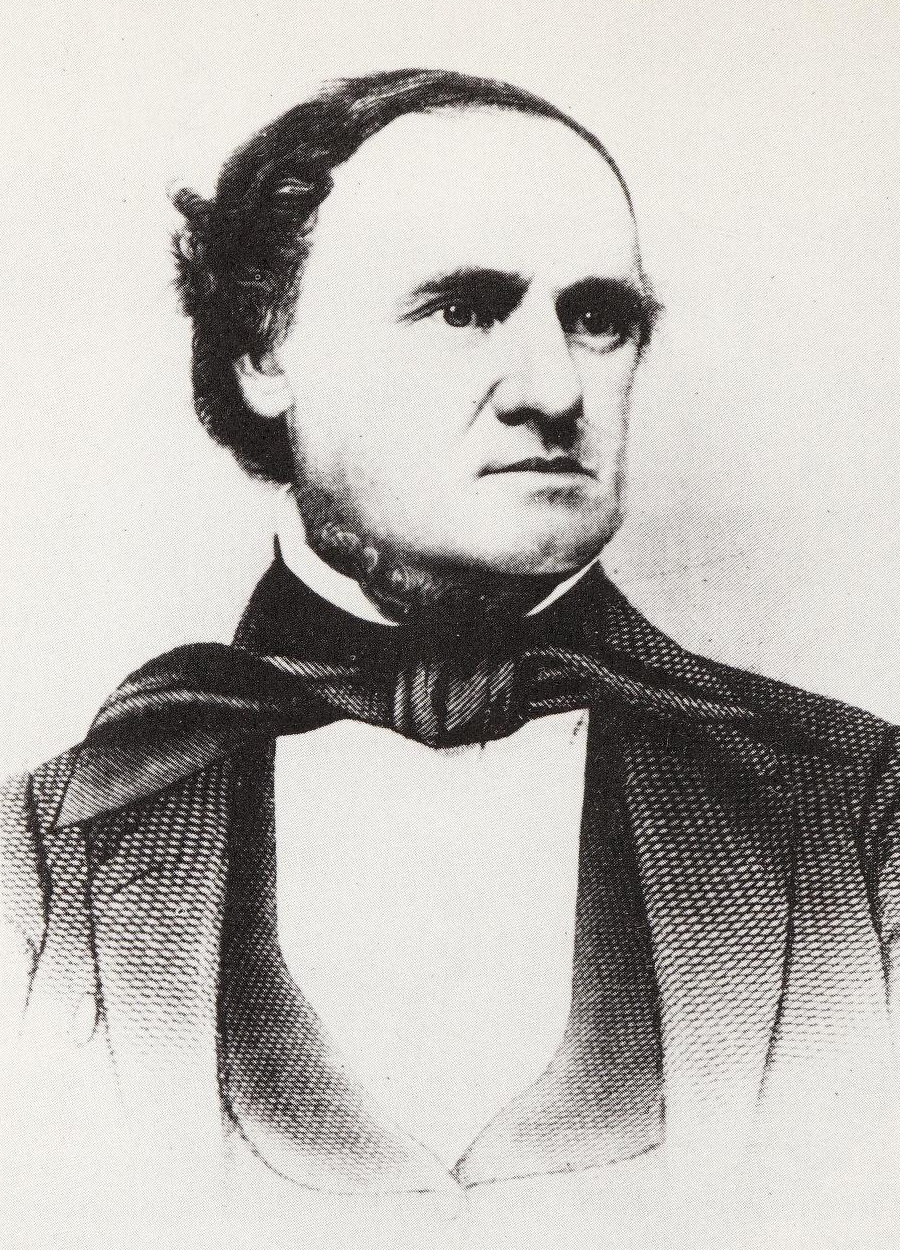

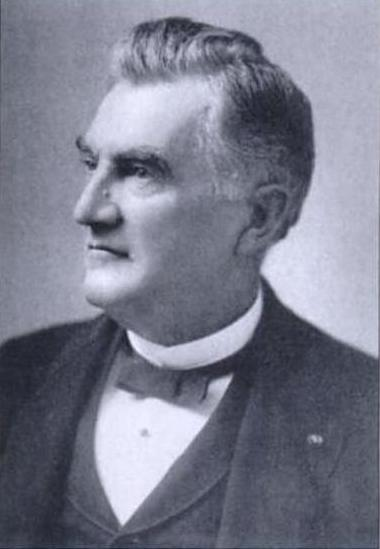

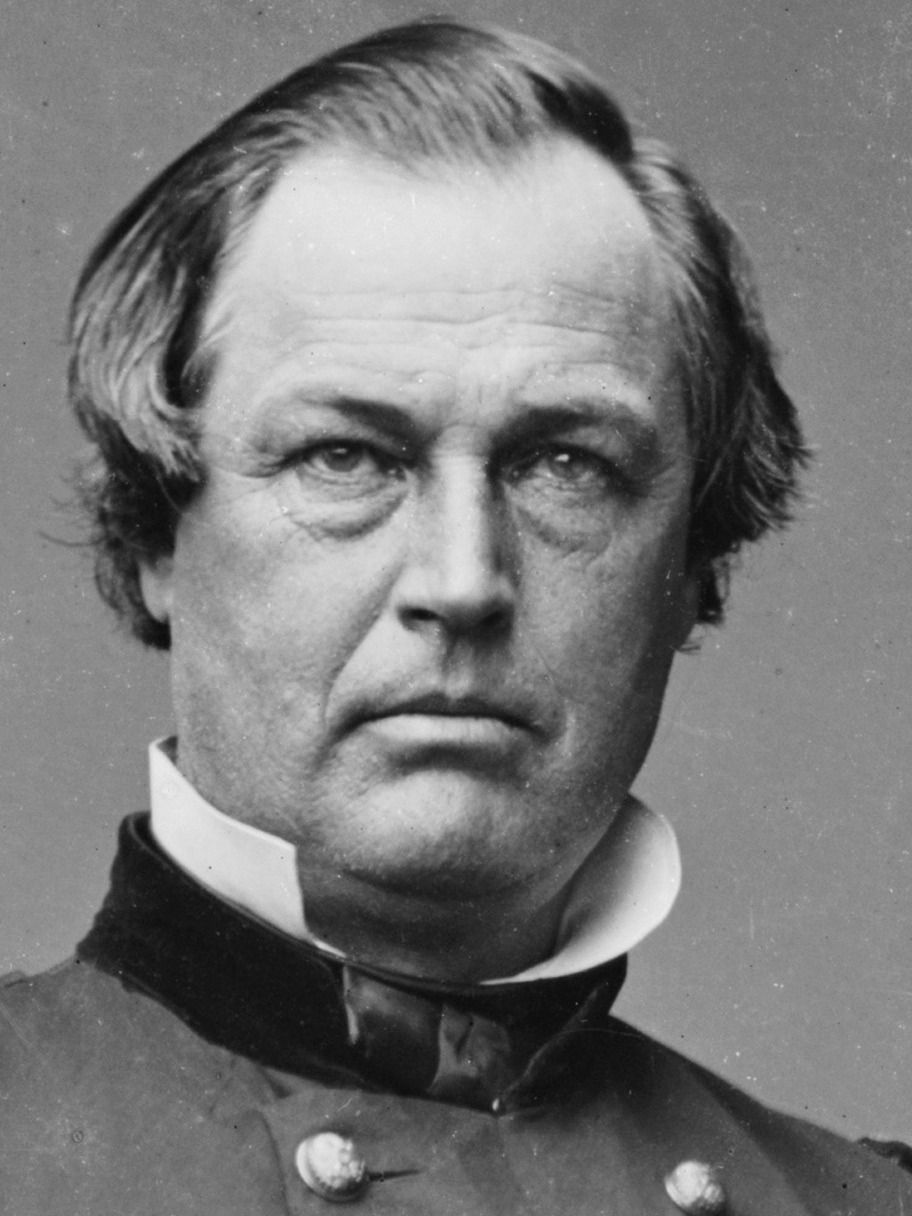
Nominee	James A. McDougall	John Nugent	John B. Weller
Party	Douglas Democratic (Anti-Lecompton)	Douglas Democratic (Lecompton)	Breckinridge Democratic
1st ballot	27 (23.9%)	9 (8.0%)	27 (23.9%)
23rd ballot	57 (54.8%)	39 (37.5%)	4 (3.8%)
Nominee	Timothy G. Phelps	James W. Denver
Party	Republican	Douglas Democratic (Lecompton)
1st ballot	23 (20.4%)	16 (14.3%)
23rd ballot	—	—
Senator before election
William M. Gwin
Democratic
Elected Senator
James A. McDougall
Democratic

The 1861 United States Senate election in California was held on April 2, 1861, by the California State Legislature to elect a U.S. senator (Class 3) to represent the State of California in the United States Senate. The legislature had previously attempted to elect a senator from March 9–20, culminating with McDougall's apparent victory on the 22nd ballot; however, it was subsequently found that McDougall had not received the requisite majority, and his election was rescinded. In a special joint session, Anti-Lecompton Democratic former U.S. representative James A. McDougall was elected over Lecompton Democratic newspaper editor John Nugent. McDougall was elected with Republican support.

== General election ==
Two-term Democrat William M. Gwin was re-elected in 1857 following the failure of the California State Legislature to elect a senator in 1855. He was not a candidate for re-election.

The California Democratic Party was divided between proslavery Chivalry or Lecompton Democrats, and free soil Anti-Lecompton Democrats. The 1860 U.S. presidential election multiplied these divisions, producing splits between supporters of the presidential candidacies of Stephen A. Douglas and John C. Breckinridge, and between Lecompton and Anti-Lecompton Douglas Democrats. The Constitutional Union Party, composed of conservative former Whigs, was of minimal importance. California Republicans were able to capitalize on the bitterness between the Democratic factions to carry the state in the national election with less than one third of the votes cast.

Gwin's term ended on March 3, 1861, without the legislature having chosen his successor. On March 9, the Senate and the House of Representatives met in joint session to hold an election for the next term. Anti-Lecompton Douglas Democrat James A. McDougall, Breckinridge Democrat John B. Weller, Republican Timothy G. Phelps, and Lecompton Douglas Democrats James W. Denver and John Nugent were the major candidates.

Several coalitions of various factions were attempted during the balloting. Lacking the votes to elect their own candidate, the Republicans threw their support to McDougall in order to forestall a coalition of the Breckinridge and Lecompton Douglas Democrats.

After multiple rounds of voting spread out over several days, McDougall was apparently elected on March 20 with 56 votes on the 22nd ballot. Subsequently, it was discovered that McDougall's total fell one vote short of the requisite majority for a legal election. The joint session reconvened on April 2, when McDougall received the necessary 57 votes on the first (23rd overall) ballot.

=== Ballots 1–5 (March 9) ===
1861 United States Senate election in California
Party	Candidate	1st ballot	2nd ballot	3rd ballot	4th ballot	5th ballot
Douglas Democratic (Anti-Lecompton)	James A. McDougall	27	26	26	25	25
Breckinridge Democratic	John B. Weller	27	23	24	17	19
Republican	Timothy G. Phelps	23	23	23	23	21
Douglas Democratic (Lecompton)	James W. Denver	16	17	15	16	15
Douglas Democratic (Lecompton)	John Nugent	9	11	13	14	16
Breckinridge Democratic	N. E. Whitesides	5	6	—N/a		
Douglas Democratic (Lecompton)	Joseph P. Hoge	2	2	2	2	2
Constitutional Union	George W. Bowie	1	1	1	1	1
	Charles M. Creanor	1	1	5	12	7
	E. H. Heacock	1	1	1	1	1
Total votes		112	111	110	111	107
Votes needed to win		57	56	56	56	54

=== Ballots 6–10 (March 11) ===
1861 United States Senate election in California
Party	Candidate	6th ballot	7th ballot	8th ballot	9th ballot	10th ballot
Douglas Democratic (Anti-Lecompton)	James A. McDougall	27	27	27	28	26
Republican	Timothy G. Phelps	20	20	19	20	20
Breckinridge Democratic	John B. Weller	19	16	13	11	10
Douglas Democratic (Lecompton)	James W. Denver	18	18	18	18	18
Douglas Democratic (Lecompton)	John Nugent	17	19	23	21	22
	Charles M. Creanor	3	3	3	3	4
Constitutional Union	George W. Bowie	1	2	2	2	1
Douglas Democratic (Lecompton)	Joseph P. Hoge	1	2	1	1	2
Republican	Augustus Rhodes	1	1	1	1	1
Douglas Democratic	James T. Ryan	—N/a	1	—N/a		
Breckinridge Democratic	B. F. Washington	—N/a			2	2
Breckinridge Democratic	A. C. Peachy	—N/a				1
Total votes		108	109	107	107	107
Votes needed to win		55	55	54	54	54

=== Ballots 11–13 (March 12) ===
1861 United States Senate election in California
Party	Candidate	11th ballot	12th ballot	13th ballot
Douglas Democratic (Anti-Lecompton)	James A. McDougall	24	25	25
Republican	Timothy G. Phelps	22	20	21
Douglas Democratic (Lecompton)	John Nugent	21	20	20
Douglas Democratic (Lecompton)	James W. Denver	17	15	15
Breckinridge Democratic	John B. Weller	10	11	12
	Charles M. Creanor	3	3	—N/a
Breckinridge Democratic	B. F. Washington	2	1	2
Douglas Democratic (Lecompton)	Joseph P. Hoge	1	1	1
Republican	Augustus Rhodes	1	1	1
Douglas Democratic	John Bidwell	—N/a	1	1
Breckinridge Democratic	Joseph L. Brent	—N/a	1	—N/a
Breckinridge Democratic	Zachariah Montgomery	—N/a	1	—N/a
Douglas Democratic (Anti-Lecompton)	Joseph Powell	—N/a	1	—N/a
Constitutional Union	George W. Bowie	—N/a		1
Breckinridge Democratic	Edward J. C. Kewen	—N/a		1
Republican	William H. Parks	—N/a		1
Republican	Edward Stanly	—N/a		1
Total votes		101	102	102
Votes needed to win		51	53	53

=== Ballot 14 (March 13) ===
1861 United States Senate election in California
Party	Candidate	14th ballot
Douglas Democratic (Anti-Lecompton)	James A. McDougall	23
Douglas Democratic (Lecompton)	John Nugent	21
Republican	Timothy G. Phelps	19
Douglas Democratic (Lecompton)	James W. Denver	16
Breckinridge Democratic	John B. Weller	8
Breckinridge Democratic	B. F. Washington	2
Douglas Democratic (Lecompton)	Joseph P. Hoge	2
Breckinridge Democratic	Edward J. C. Kewen	2
Republican	Augustus Rhodes	1
Breckinridge Democratic	Zachariah Montgomery	1
Breckinridge Democratic	Tod Robinson	1
Total votes		96
Votes needed to win		49

=== Ballots 15–16 (March 15) ===
1861 United States Senate election in California
Party	Candidate	15th ballot	16th ballot
Douglas Democratic (Anti-Lecompton)	James A. McDougall	27	32
Republican	Timothy G. Phelps	23	23
Douglas Democratic (Lecompton)	John Nugent	18	16
Douglas Democratic (Lecompton)	James W. Denver	15	12
Breckinridge Democratic	John B. Weller	9	11
	Charles M. Creanor	8	3
Breckinridge Democratic	B. F. Washington	2	1
Constitutional Union	George W. Bowie	1	1
Republican	Augustus Rhodes	1	1
Republican	William H. Parks	1	1
Breckinridge Democratic	Tod Robinson	1	2
Breckinridge Democratic	Jackson Temple	1	7
Total votes		110	110
Votes needed to win		56	56

=== Ballots 17–18 (March 19) ===
1861 United States Senate election in California
Party	Candidate	17th ballot	18th ballot
Douglas Democratic (Anti-Lecompton)	James A. McDougall	26	27
Republican	Timothy G. Phelps	23	24
Douglas Democratic (Lecompton)	John Nugent	19	17
Douglas Democratic (Lecompton)	James W. Denver	15	11
Breckinridge Democratic	John B. Weller	11	11
Breckinridge Democratic	Joseph L. Brent	4	4
	Charles M. Creanor	4	6
Breckinridge Democratic	B. F. Washington	3	3
Constitutional Union	George W. Bowie	2	2
Douglas Democratic	John Bidwell	1	—N/a
Douglas Democratic	N. Greene Curtis	1	1
	William B. Dickinson	—N/a	1
	E. H. Heacock	1	1
Total votes		110	108
Votes needed to win		56	55

=== Ballots 19–22 (March 20) ===
On the 22nd ballot, the votes for Anderson and Casserly were omitted from the official tally by mistake, and McDougall was erroneously pronounced elected with 56 votes—one short of a majority with the votes for Anderson and Casserly included.

1861 United States Senate election in California
Party	Candidate	19th ballot	20th ballot	21st ballot	22nd ballot
Douglas Democratic (Lecompton)	John Nugent	45	44	44	47
Douglas Democratic (Anti-Lecompton)	James A. McDougall	29	30	30	56
Republican	Timothy G. Phelps	23	23	22	1
Breckinridge Democratic	John B. Weller	6	7	7	6
Douglas Democratic (Lecompton)	Joseph P. Hoge	2	1	2	—N/a
Constitutional Union	George W. Bowie	1	1	1	—N/a
Republican	Caleb Burbank	1	1	1	—N/a
Douglas Democratic (Lecompton)	Eugene Casserly	1	1	1	1
	Charles M. Creanor	1	1	—N/a	1
Republican	Samuel W. Inge	1	—N/a		
	Major Anderson	—N/a			1
Total votes		111	110	108	113
Abstentions		2	—	—	—
Votes needed to win		56	56	55	57

=== Ballot 23 (April 2) ===
1861 United States Senate election in California
Party	Candidate	23rd ballot
Douglas Democratic (Anti-Lecompton)	James A. McDougall	57
Douglas Democratic (Lecompton)	John Nugent	39
Breckinridge Democratic	John B. Weller	4
Douglas Democratic (Lecompton)	Eugene Casserly	1
Democratic	James Shields	1
Total votes		104
Votes needed to win		53

== Bibliography ==
- California (1861). Journal of the House of Assembly of California [...] (PDF). Sacramento.
- Hittell, Theodore H. (1898). History of California. San Francisco.
