= Dos Cabezas, Arizona =

Ghost town in Cochise County, Arizona

- Unincorporated community
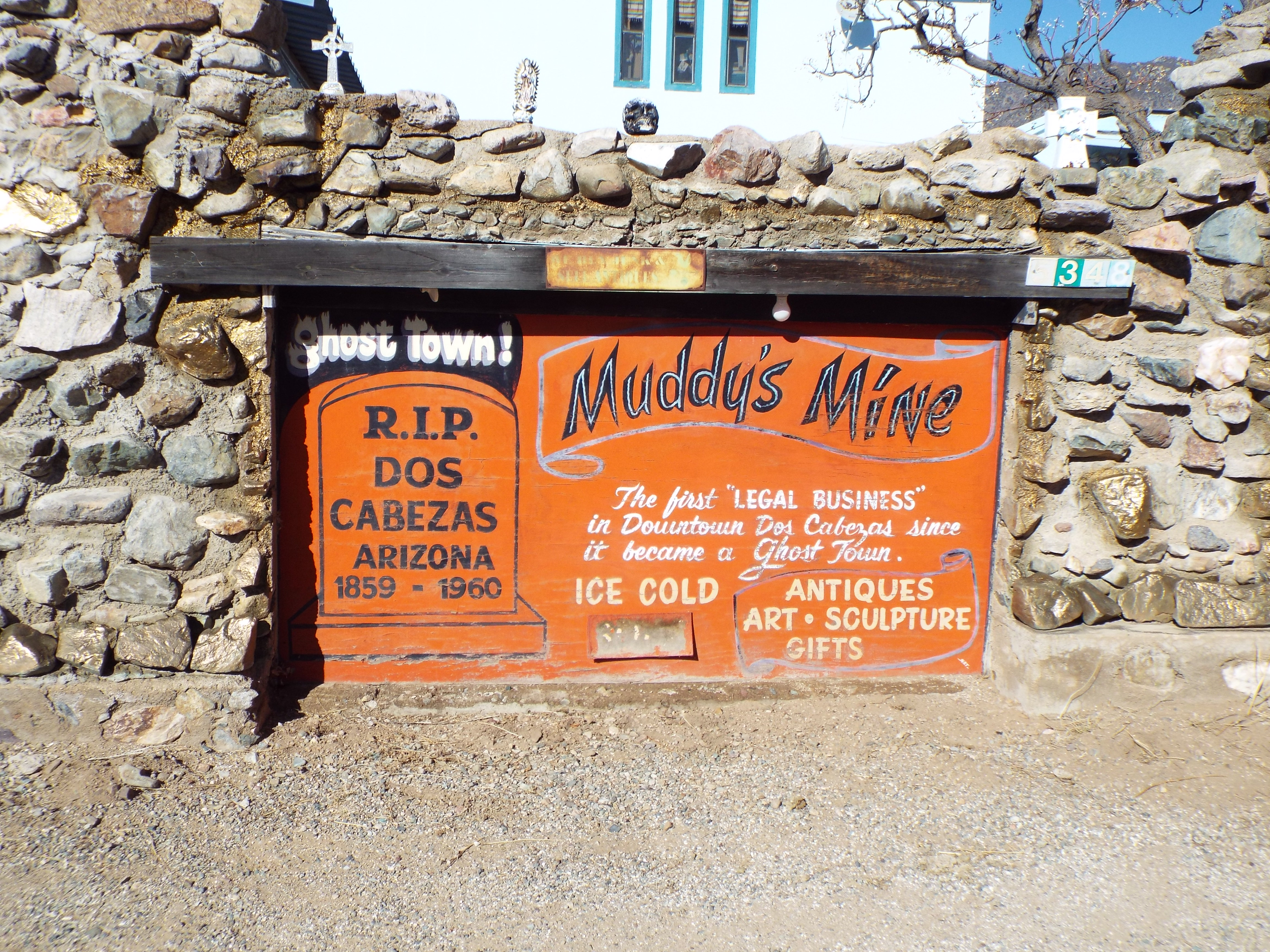
- Dos Cabezas

- Location within Arizona Location within the United States
- Coordinates: 32°10′31″N 109°36′48″W
- Country: United States
- State: Arizona
- County: Cochise
- Time zone: UTC-7 (MST (no daylight saving time))
- Area code: 520
- GNIS feature ID: 4036

Dos Cabezas, Spanish for Two Heads, is an unincorporated community in Cochise County, located in the U.S. state of Arizona. It lies at an elevation of 5,082 feet (1,549 m) in the Dos Cabezas Mountains. It is now a ghost town.

Dos Cabezas
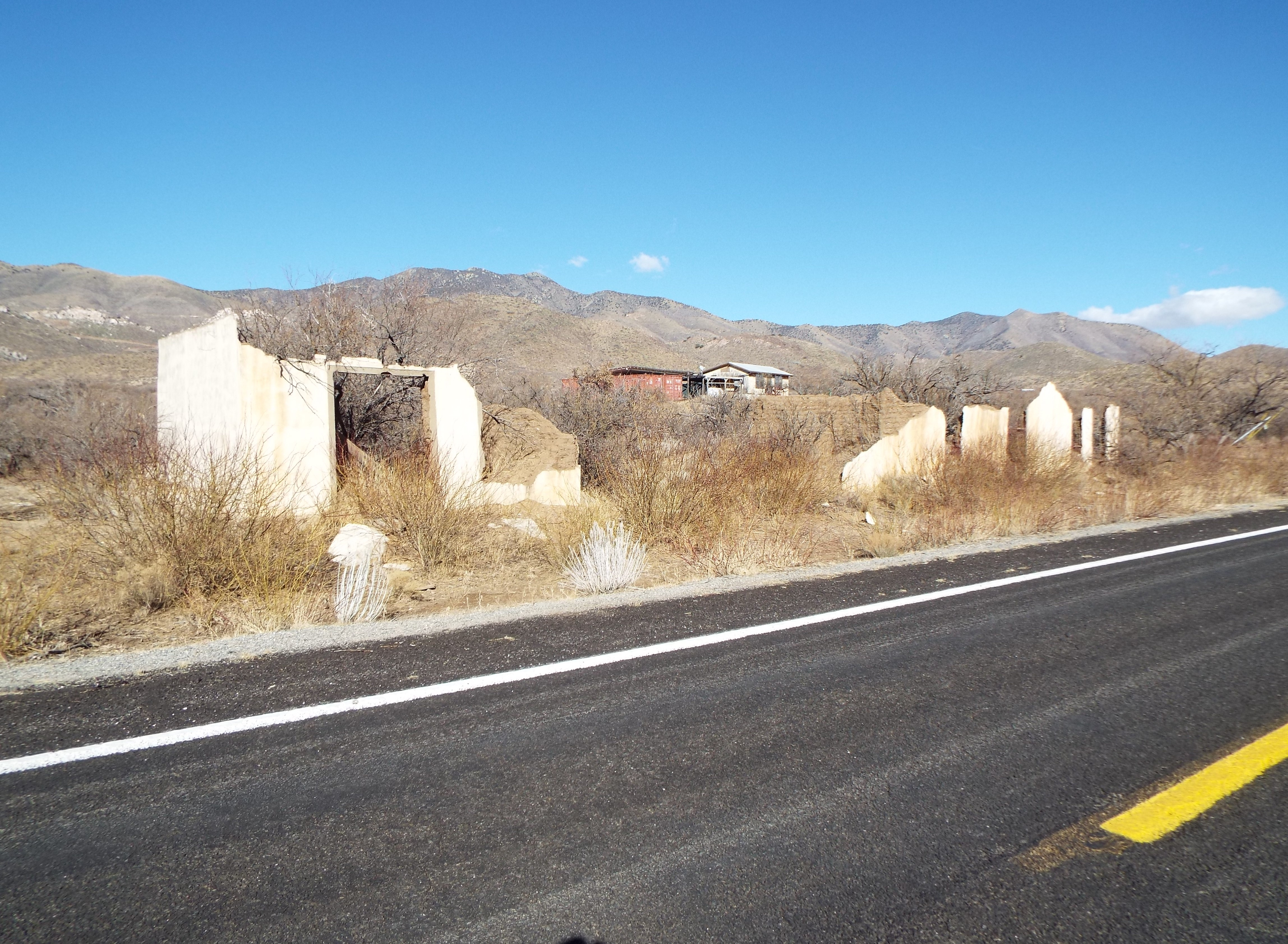
Town ruins

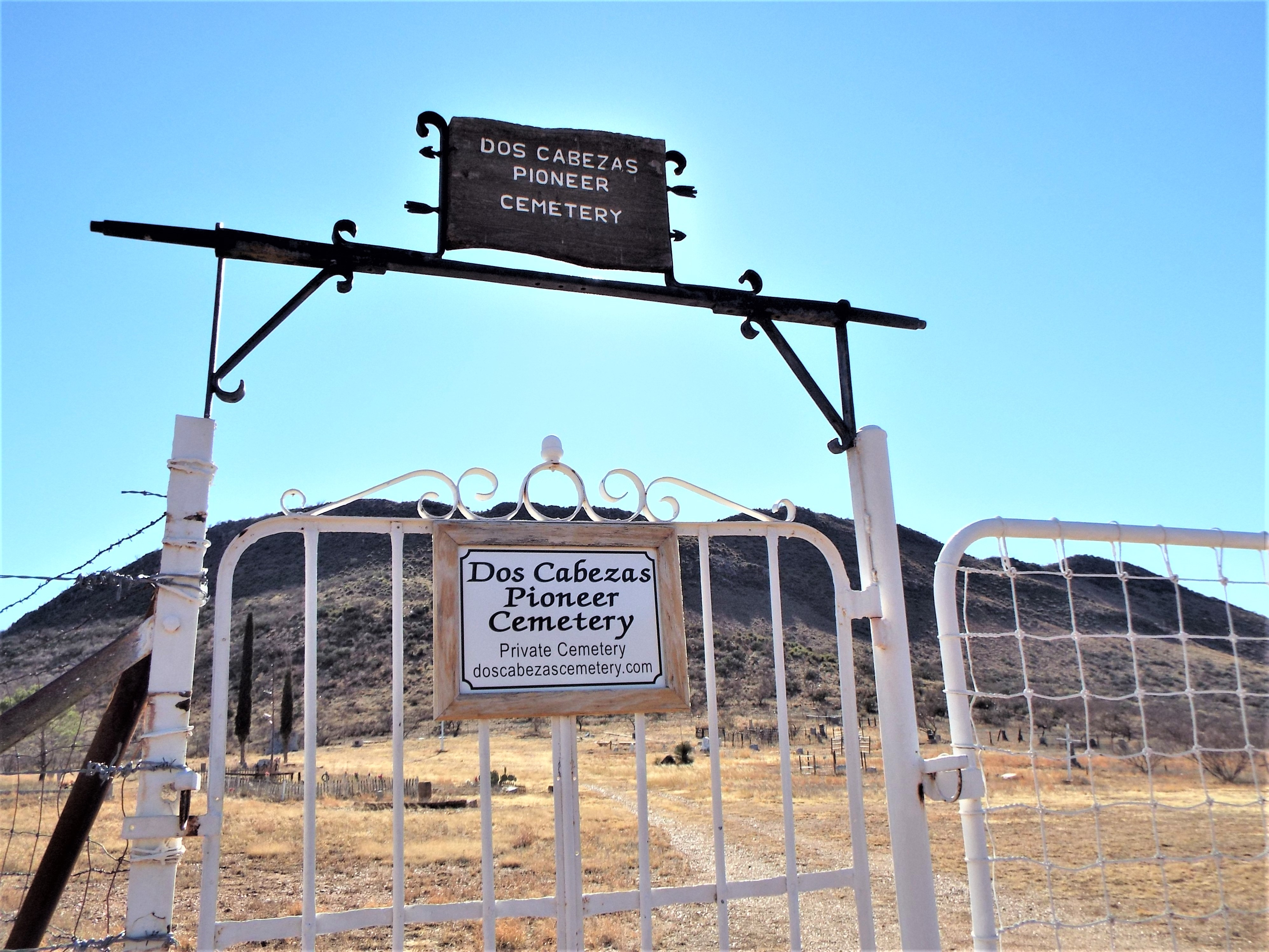
Dos Cabezas Pioneer Cemetery
