= Macho Creek (Luna County, New Mexico) =

Stream in New Mexico

Macho Creek is a stream in Sierra and Luna County, New Mexico. Macho Creek has its source in Sierra County at an elevation of 7,089 feet, on the north slope of Macho Peak, at 32°45′55″N 107°43′03″W in the Mimbres Mountains. It runs to the southwest, subsiding into the earth, about 2 miles north of Myndus, New Mexico at an elevation of 4,180 feet (1,270 meters).

== History ==
Macho Creek was a camping place of the Mormon Battalion on November 13–14, 1846, during their expedition to establish Cooke's Wagon Road between Santa Fe to San Diego. Lieutenant Colonel Philip St. George Cooke wrote of it in his journal:

"November 14.— Expecting to march thirty miles (to the "Mimbres") without water, and after the hard and late march yesterday, I lay until near 10 o'clock, and cooked a ration; then all the animals were watered, and I got off twenty minutes after 11 o'clock. We proceeded in a direction 35° west of south; after a mile of ascent over rolling ground, we struck the margin of a vast plain surface extending indefinitely to the southwest, and slightly inclined towards us; after coming about four miles, we met one of the guides, who stated that Leroux was at a stream seven or eight miles more to our right, near the mountain range; that the "Mimbres" had not been found, &c I then took his course, southwest, proceeded about five miles, where he bent more to the right, and finally, near a mile, short to the right into a valley where a stream running from the hills and mountains to the right loses itself in the sand. Nearly above is a fringe of timber, cottonwood, ash, &c The prairie to-day was generally covered thick with large gravel, with intervals of clay, all well covered with grass, both gamma and buffalo, in places quite green and luxuriant. (We come through prairie dog villages, always found with buffalo grass.)"

"... Just in the camp is apparently the foundation of a house; the stones, though large, are rounded; it rises a foot or two from the ground. Close by, besides fragments of earthen pottery, is a broken mortar of a very hard red stone, resembling a burr stone; all the exterior is apparently in its natural rough state; there seems to be no other similar stone near."

"November 15 — 8 o'clock, a. m. — The guides are behindhand; it rains a little, and there is no fuel at the next camping ground; there being good grass and fuel here, I have reluctantly concluded to lay by to-day; but I have no doubt of its being for the general advantage. Leroux, Mr. Hall, Dr. Foster, the interpreter, Charboneaux, and three Spaniards have gone, and I have urged the necessity of an active and more distant examination of the country."

"Evening. — It has blown a gale all day, raining, snowing, and shining alternately. It is very cold, although the wind is but little west of southwest. I sent for an ox which was left yesterday, "given out," and had it slaughtered and, together with the smallest and poorest beef, issued as a ration; gaining thereby about a third of a ration. I have calculated now, at the rate of issue that we have, after to-day, ninety days of meat and eighty-six of flour."
