= Mescal Arroyo =

Waterway in Arizona, US

Mescal Arroyo is an arroyo, a tributary to Ciénega Creek in the Santa Cruz River watershed. Its mouth is at its confluence with Cienega Creek within the Cienega Creek Natural Preserve in Pima County, Arizona. Its source is at 31°59′26″N 110°26′17″W, to the east at the head of the valley near Mescal in Cochise County, Arizona.
