= John Nugent (journalist) =

American journalist

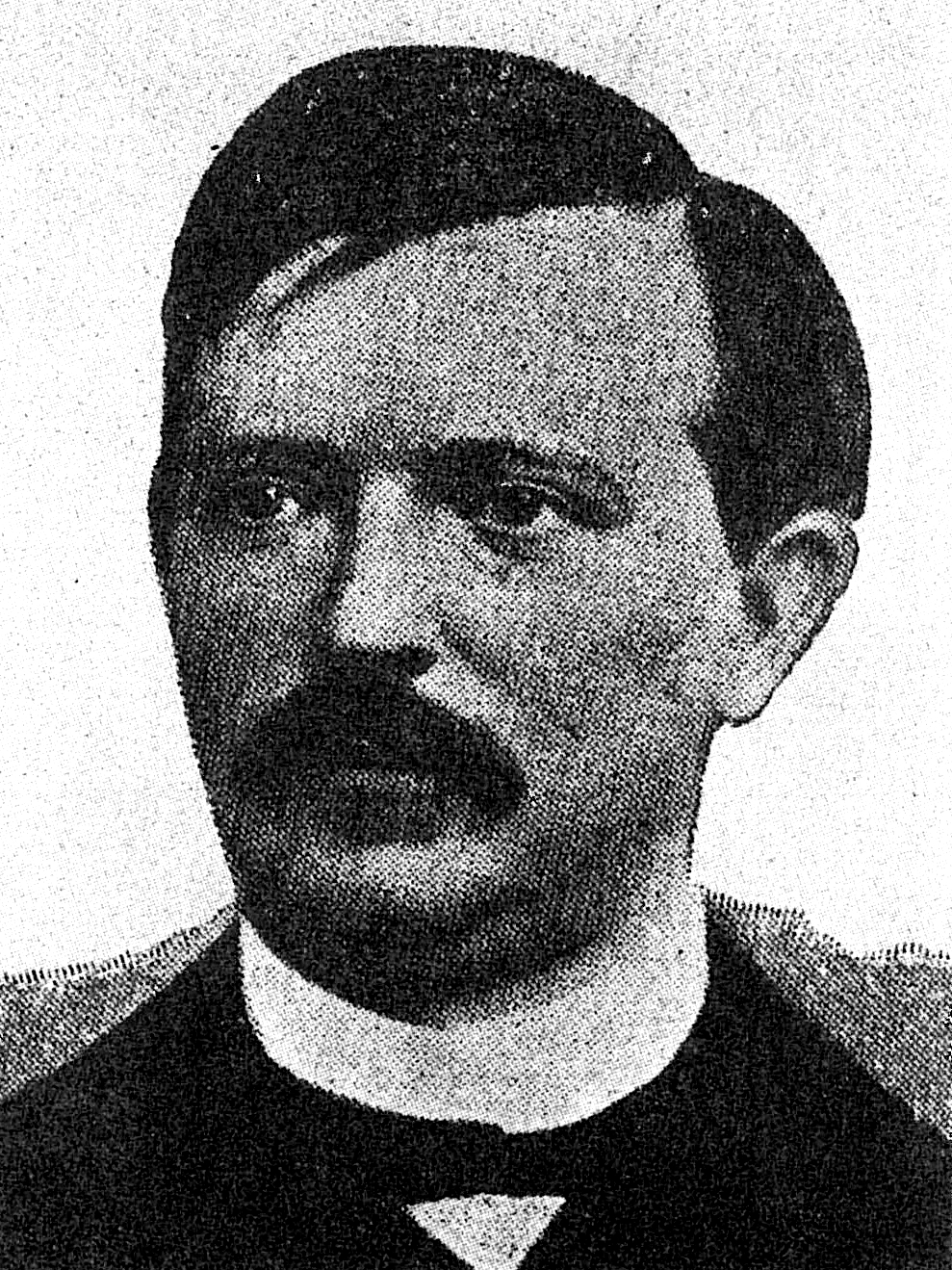
John Nugent

John Nugent (c. 1821 – March 29, 1880) was an Irish journalist and U.S. government agent.

== Life ==
Nugent was born in County Galway but travelled with his parents to the United States at an early age. He was educated at a Catholic college in New Jersey. In the 1840s, he worked as a journalist with the New York Herald. In 1848, Nugent was leaked a copy of the Treaty of Guadalupe Hidalgo, which would end the Mexican–American War after it was amended and approved by the Senate. Nugent was questioned by senators but did not reveal his source. In 1848, he was jailed by the U.S. Senate for a month.

Subsequently, Nugent traveled with a party of Forty-Niners from New York, led by John Coffee Hays, that traveled to California from San Antonio, Texas, over the Southern Route, through El Paso across New Mexico Territory to Fort Yuma. The party pioneered a shortcut on Cooke's Wagon Road that saved a long journey to the south. That route became known as the Tucson Cutoff. Later Nugent's Pass and Nugent's Springs on that route were named for Nugent, who gave his notes of the journey to aid Lt. John G. Parke in his expedition to find a railroad route from the Pima Villages to the Rio Grande.

In 1851, Nugent became owner-editor of San Francisco Herald. In 1856 he opposed the re-establishment of the San Francisco Committee of Vigilance, an extra-legal organization for the preservation of law and order. His failure to support it was an unpopular editorial decision that caused the paper to collapse a few years later in 1860. This was an event from which his career never recovered. He continued to work as a journalist and unsuccessfully ran for U.S. Senate in 1861.

In 1858, President James Buchanan appointed Nugent special agent to New Caledonia (British Columbia). Buchanan wanted to see how Americans and their interests were faring in the area in light of the Fraser Canyon Gold Rush. Nugent quickly discovered that there was little tension and good relations between the Americans and the British.

Nugent appears to have created a rift through a dispute with Governor James Douglas over the treatment of American citizens in the courts. He further suggested that the Americans would intervene quickly if conflict arose. This came out of the feeling he had that New Caledonia and Vancouver Island should and would be annexed to the United States. The diplomatic difficulties were not great and the negativity fell on John Nugent personally.

Later in life John Nugent married and had children. He married Magdalena Estudillo on August 26, 1860. Magdalena was the daughter of Jose Joaquin Estudillo (1798–1852), the owner of the Rancho San Leandro. The Estudillos were the founders of the city of San Leandro, California. John and his wife, lived with her mother at 550 West Estudillo Avenue which was later the site of St. Leander's Church. The couple had four children; Sybil G. (1862–1909), Maud (1866–1922), Elsie (1868–1942) and John (1871–1948).

Nugent tried to re-establish the Herald in 1868 but was unsuccessful. At the end of the 1870s, Nugent worked on his memoirs, and died on March 29, 1880, in San Leandro, California.
