= Dragoon Wash (Arizona) =

Stream in Cochise County

Dragoon Wash, a stream tributary to the San Pedro River, in Cochise County, Arizona. It has its source just southwest of the town of Dragoon. 32°01′21″N 110°02′46″W It runs southwesterly to meet the San Pedro River.

== History ==
Dragoon Wash originally appeared on an 1855 Railroad Survey map, with the name Quercus Canyon, named for the oaks that appear along its course. Its valley and stream bed provided the route shortest route between Dragoon Springs and the San Pedro River, through the Dragoon Pass between the Dragoon Mountains and Little Dragoon Mountains. From the mouth of Dragoon Wash the San Pedro River Crossing was 5 or 6 miles northward on the east bank of the San Pedro River. This route was used by the San Antonio-San Diego Mail Line, Butterfield Overland Mail, and subsequent stage lines. The Butterfield Overland Mail
