= Johnny Lyon Hills =

Range of hills in Cochise County, Arizona

Johnny Lyon Hills, are a range of hills, north of the Tres Alamos Wash and the Little Dragoon Mountains in Cochise County, Arizona. Its highest elevation is the summit of 5732 feet at 32°08′09″N 110°13′59″W.
