= Allen Flat =

Landform in Cochise County, Arizona

Coordinates: 31°14′46″N 110°08′01″W

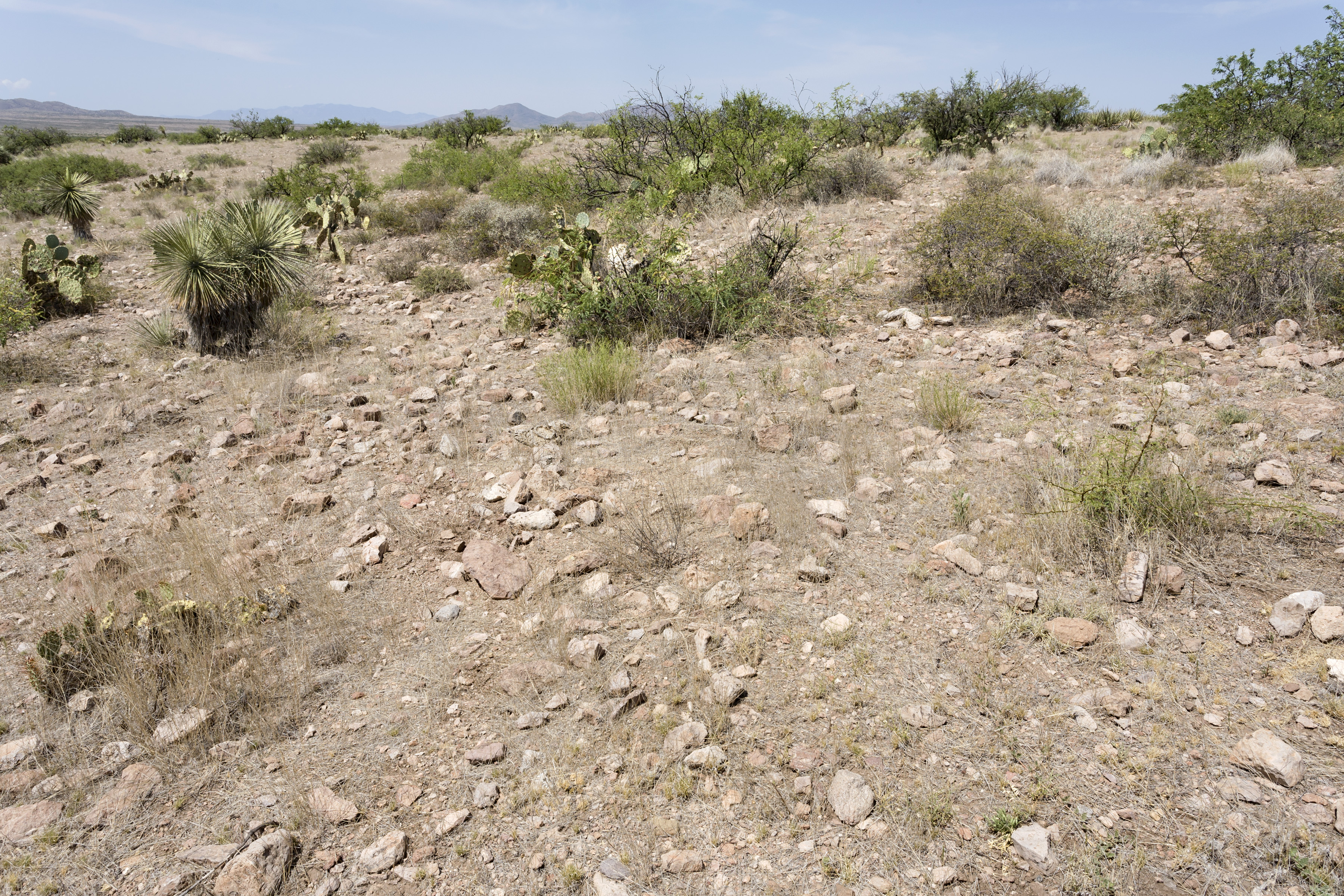
Southeast side of Allen Flat

Allen Flat is a flat in Cochise County, Arizona.
