= Dragoon Spring =

Waterbody in Cochise County, Arizona

Coordinates: 31°59′05″N 110°00′56″W

Dragoon Spring is a spring in Cochise County, Arizona. It is located in Jordan Canyon on the northwest slope of the Dragoon Mountains at an elevation of 5,148 feet (1,569 meters).

It is the site of burial for four Confederate Army soldiers who sought to invade the Territory of New Mexico.
