= Cloverdale Creek =

Stream in Hidalgo County, New Mexico

Coordinates: 31°24′31″N 108°54′52″W

Cloverdale Creek is a stream in Hidalgo County, New Mexico.
