= Jug Canyon =

Jug Canyon is a valley in Sierra County, New Mexico. Its mouth is at its confluence with Outlaw Canyon at an elevation of 4,511 feet / 1,375 meters, where they form the head of Arroyo Cuervo which flows into the Rio Grande to the east, in Doña Ana County, New Mexico. The head of Jug Canyon is located at 32°38′44″N 107°27′50″W at an elevation of 4760 feet, 2 miles northwest of Nutt Mountain where it opens up into the plain between the Good Sight Mountains to the east and the Mimbres Mountains to the west.
