= Guadalupe Pass (New Mexico) =

Mountain pass over the Guadalupe Mountains in New Mexico, United States

Coordinates: 31°20′58″N 108°59′09″W

Guadalupe Pass is a mountain pass located in the Guadalupe Mountains of Hidalgo County, New Mexico. It lies at an elevation of 5075 feet or 1547 m.

== History ==
Guadalupe Pass was used first by the Spanish and then by the Mexicans for Janos - Fronteras Road between Chihuahua and Fronteras, Sonora from the late 17th century. In 1846, American soldiers of the Mormon Battalion led by Philip St. George Cooke used the pass and the old road for the route of Cooke's Wagon Road between the pass and the San Pedro River. This road was heavily used by the 49ers during the California Gold Rush. It was soon after replaced by a more direct route, the Tucson Cutoff to the north.
