= John Nugent (footballer) =

English footballer

Personal information
- Place of birth: England
- Position: Goalkeeper

Senior career*
Years	Team	Apps	(Gls)
1904	Notts County	3	(0)
- * Club domestic league appearances and goals

John Nugent (fl. 1904) was an English-born footballer who played in the Football League for Notts County.
