= Dos Cabezas Mountains =

Landform in Cochise County, Arizona

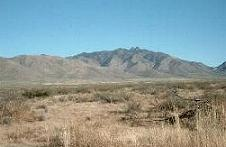

Highest point
- Peak: Dos Cabezas Peaks
- Elevation: 8,354 ft (2,546 m)

Dimensions
- Length: 15 mi (24 km) NW x SE
- Width: 6 mi (9.7 km)

Geography
- Location within Arizona
- Country: United States
- State: Arizona
- Region: (northeast)-Sonoran Desert
- Municipality: Bowie, Arizona (Willcox & Fort Bowie-W)
- Range coordinates: 32°12′30″N 109°34′33″W
- Borders on: Chiricahua Mountains-SE; San Simon Valley-NE; Sulphur Springs Valley-W & SW

The Dos Cabezas is a mountain range in southeasternmost Arizona, United States. The 11,700 acres (4,700 ha) Dos Cabezas Mountains Wilderness lies 20 miles (32 km) east of Willcox and 7 miles (11 km) south of Bowie in Cochise County. The mountain range's name means Two Heads in Spanish, for the twin granite peaks, Dos Cabezas Peaks, that sit atop the range.

== Geology ==
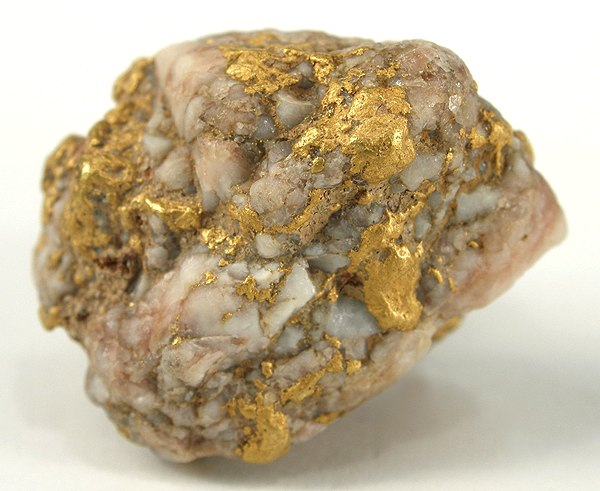
A gold-quartz specimen from the Dos Cabezas Mountains

The wilderness consists of the rugged slopes of the Dos Cabezas Mountains, with elevations ranging from 4,080 to 7,500 feet (1,200 to 2,300 m). There is a diverse terrain of steep mountain slopes, granite outcroppings and vegetated canyon floors. The higher mountains and ridges offer long-distance views of Sulphur Springs and San Simon Valleys and numerous mountain ranges.

== Wildlife ==
Several developed and natural springs in the wilderness provide water for the abundant wildlife. White-tailed and mule deer, mountain lions, golden eagles, bald eagles and many other animals inhabit the Dos Cabezas Mountains. The collared lizard may be found in the upper portions of Buckeye Canyon. The peregrine falcon migrates through the area. The peregrine was delisted from endangered status in 1999. The majority of the wilderness contains mountain shrub, desert shrub and riparian vegetation. As of 2021, the Arizona Game and Fish Department has been releasing photos of a jaguar that has been seen in this area since November 2016 with 45 documented events. This is the second known jaguar living in the state.

== See also ==
- Chiricahua Mountains – connected at southeast
