= Willcox Playa =

Dry lake in Cochise County, Arizona

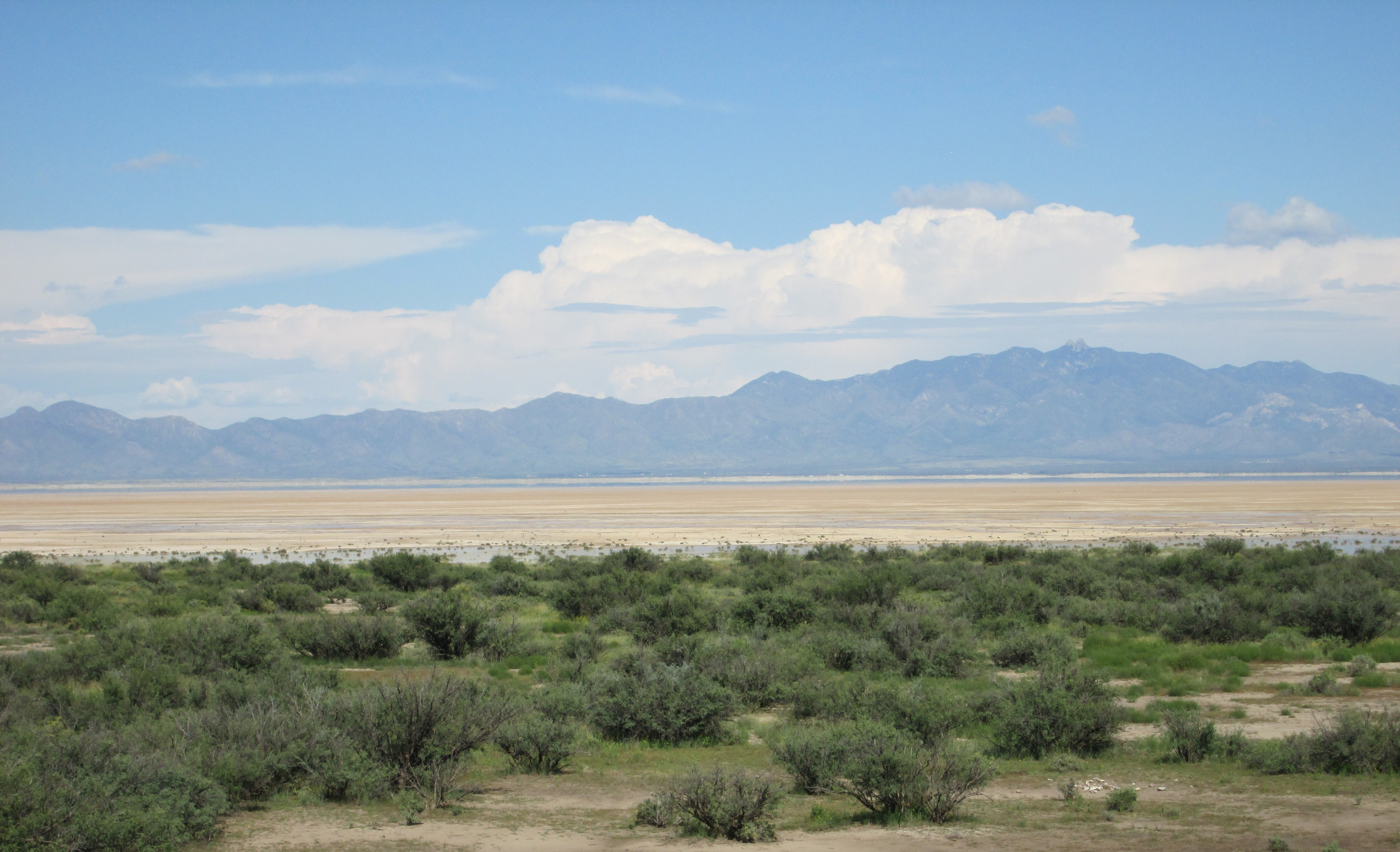
- View facing east across the Willcox Playa toward the Dos Cabezas Mountains from a point just east of Cochise, Arizona.

- Location within Arizona
- Location: Cochise County, Arizona
- Nearest city: Willcox, Arizona
- Coordinates: 32°08′28″N 109°50′53″W
- Area: 2,369 acres (959 ha)
- Designated: 1966

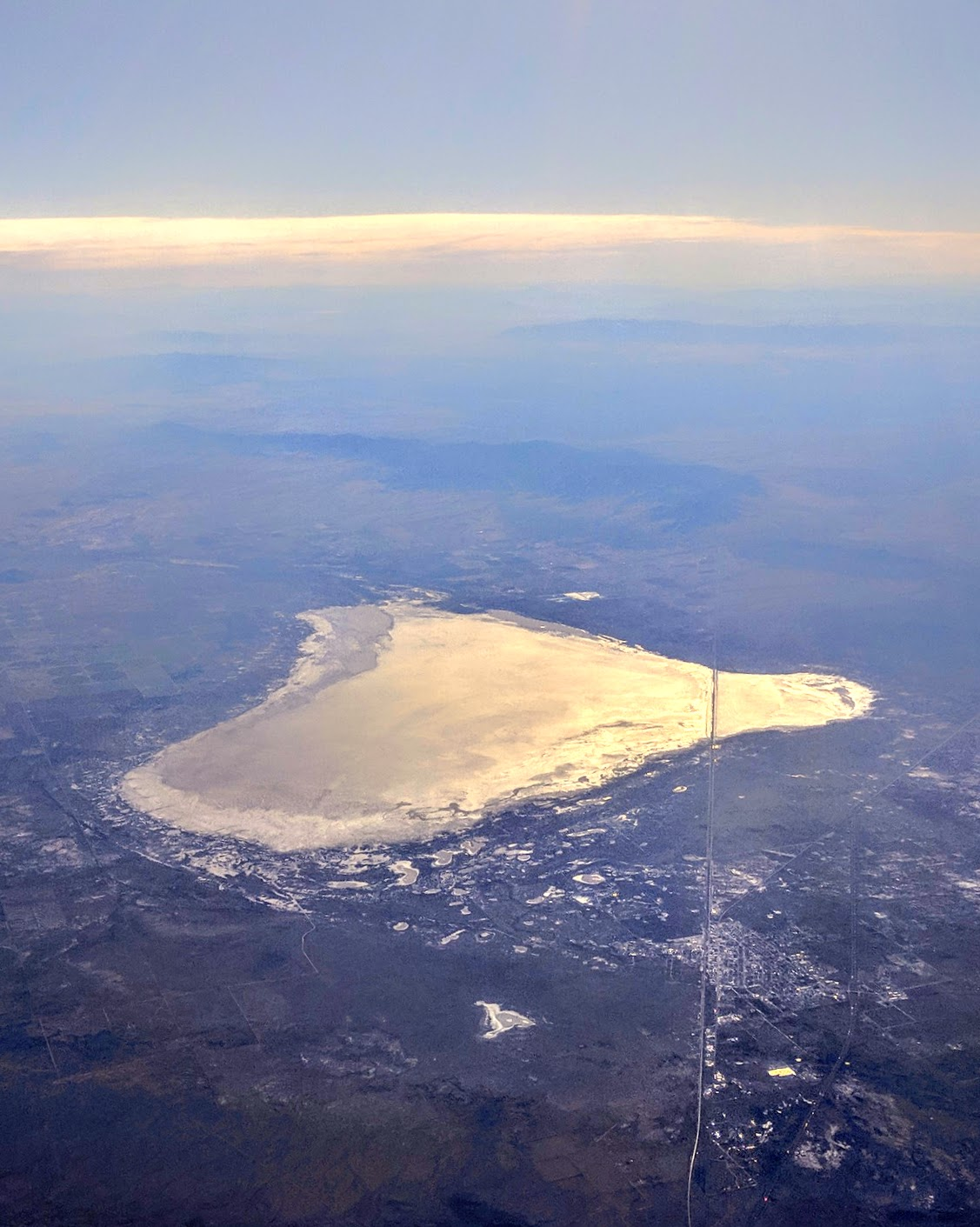
Aerial view from the northeast of Willcox Playa, near Willcox, Arizona, January 2019. The line across the righthand side is a pair of railroad tracks and S. Railroad Ave., heading from Willcox on the near edge of the playa toward Cochise on the far edge of the playa.

The Willcox Playa is a large endorheic dry lake or sink (playa) adjacent to Willcox, Arizona in Cochise County, in the southeast corner of the state. It is part of the Sonoran Desert ecoregion and is the remnant of a Pleistocene era pluvial Lake Cochise. The playa itself is roughly 8 miles (13 km) wide by 10 miles (16 km) long, with an area of approximately 40 square miles (100 km^{2}). Portions of the dry lake bed have been used as a bombing range by the US military. Most of this area is currently used by the Electronic Proving Ground, based at Fort Huachuca. It was designated a National Natural Landmark in 1966 for its fossil pollen captured underground, the thousands of sandhill cranes that roost in the area and the largest diversity of tiger beetles in the United States.

== Location ==
The Willcox Playa is located in the northern region of Sulphur Springs Valley; drainage to the playa from the east is from the connected Dos Cabezas–Chiricahua Mountains; drainage from the southwest is from the Dragoon Mountains, and the Little Dragoon Mountains. During the summer, intense solar heating sometimes gives rise to large dust devils, and strong winds from thunderstorms and winter storms can produce dust storms rising from the dry lake that can hinder traffic on the Interstate 10 highway.

== Willcox Playa Wildlife Area ==
In the vicinity of the dry lake is the Willcox Playa Wildlife Area administered by the Arizona Game and Fish Department. The location boasts rich wildlife, and hosts the annual January birding festival Wings Over Willcox.
