= Cooke's Wagon Road =

Part of the Southern Emigrant Trail

Route of Cooke's Wagon Road between the Rio Grande and Gila Rivers, 1846–1847 Distances between stops from Camp opposite San Diego, Nuevo Mexico.
Date	Location	Distance
November 13, 1846	Fosters Hole, Nuevo Mexico	16 mi (26 km)
November 14–15, 1846	Mountain Streamlet, Nuevo Mexico	12 mi (19 km)
November 16, 1846	Cooke's Spring, Chihuahua	13 mi (21 km)
November 17, 1846	Fryingpan Canyon, Chihuahua	3 mi (4.8 km)
November 18, 1846	Mimbres River Crossing, Chihuahua	18 mi (29 km)
November 19–20, 1846	Ojo de Vaca, Chihuahua	18 mi (29 km)
November 21, 1846	Burro Cienega, Chihuahua	12 mi (19 km)
November 22, 1846	Waterless Camp, Sonora	15 mi (24 km)
November 23–24, 1846	Whitmire Spring, Chihuahua on the west shore of Las Playas east of Whitmire Pass	25 mi (40 km)
November 25, 1846	Bull Creek, Sonora	17 mi (27 km)
November 26, 1846	Bercham Draw, Sonora	12 mi (19 km)
November 27, 1846	Cloverdale Creek, Sonora	12 mi (19 km)
November 28–29, 1846	Guadalupe Pass at Yanos Road, Sonora	5 mi (8.0 km)
November 30, 1846	Guadalupe Canyon, Sonora	7 mi (11 km)
December 1, 1846	Guadalupe Canyon, Sonora	7 mi (11 km)
December 2–3, 1846	San Bernardino Ranch, Sonora	9 mi (14 km)
December 4, 1846	Rocky Basin of water, Sonora	8 mi (13 km)
December 5, 1846	Large Spring, Blackwater Creek, Sonora	14 mi (23 km)
December 6–7, 1846	Waterhole Grove, Sonora	12 mi (19 km)
December 8, 1846	Waterless Camp, Sonora	17 mi (27 km)
December 9, 1846	1st Camp, San Pedro River, Sonora	16 mi (26 km)
December 10, 1846	2nd Camp, San Pedro River, Sonora	15 mi (24 km)
December 11, 1846	3rd Camp, San Pedro River, Sonora "Battle of the Bulls"	11 mi (18 km)
December 12, 1846	4th Camp, San Pedro River, Sonora	15 mi (24 km)
December 13, 1846	5th Camp, San Pedro River, Sonora	7 mi (11 km)
December 14, 1846	Mescal Still-house, Sonora	20 mi (32 km)
December 15, 1846	Waterless Camp, Sonora	12 mi (19 km)
December 16–17, 1846	Camp at Tucson, Sonora	16 mi (26 km)
December 18, 1846	1st Camp beyond Tucson, Sonora	24 mi (39 km)
December 19, 1846	2nd Camp beyond Tucson, Sonora	30 mi (48 km)
December 20, 1846	3rd Camp beyond Tucson, Sonora	10 mi (16 km)
December 21, 1846	Cooke's 1st Camp on the Gila River, Sonora; Gila Trail	9 mi (14 km)

Cooke's Wagon Road or Cooke's Road was the first wagon road between the Rio Grande and the Colorado River to San Diego, through the Mexican provinces of Nuevo México, Chihuahua, Sonora and Alta California, established by Philip St. George Cooke and the Mormon Battalion, from October 19, 1846 to January 29, 1847 during the Mexican–American War. It became the first of the wagon routes between New Mexico and California that with subsequent modifications before and during the California Gold Rush eventually became known as the Southern Trail or Southern Emigrant Trail.

== Cooke and the Mormon Battalion establish the route ==
On February 22, 1847, Philip St. George Cooke submitted a report of his journey, printed by the U. S. Senate in 1849, as the "Official Journal of Lieutenant Colonel Philip St. George Cooke from Santa Fe, in New Mexico, to San Diego, in Upper California". This report recorded his experience in command of the Mormon Battalion and its expedition to establish the wagon route that soon became known to the Forty-niners and later travelers who followed that route as Cooke's Wagon Road or Cooke's Road. Later in 1878 Cooke wrote a book "The Conquest of New Mexico and California" that covered the journey but in less detail than in his original report.

Cooke's Road began from his last camp on the west bank the Rio Grande "across the river from San Diego", 258 miles southwest of Santa Fe, New Mexico and 29 miles down the river from the camp where Colonel Stephen W. Kearny's Expedition left the Rio Grande, for California, crossing the mountains to the headwaters of the Gila River, which he then followed downstream to its confluence with the Colorado River. Cooke was ordered to take the wagons Kearny could not take with him in the rugged terrain of the New Mexico mountains, and build a wagon road that they could traverse and link it up to his route farther west on the Gila River.

Cooke's road extended westward 433 miles, southwestward through Guadalupe Pass in the Guadalupe Mountains, westward to the San Pedro River, following it northward until turning westward near modern Benson, Arizona to Tucson. From Tucson it crossed the arid desert northwestward to the Gila River, 9 miles east of the Pima Villages, where his route rejoined the Gila Trail of Colonel Kearny.

== Subsequent Journey along Kearney's Route ==
From his first Camp on the Gila River, Cooke then followed Kearny's Gila Trail route continuing to build a wagon road along the Gila River to the Yuma Crossing of the Colorado River. Following the crossing were 89 miles across the Colorado Desert between the waterholes of Cooke's Wells, Alamo Mocho Well, and Indian Wells, to Carrizo Creek and to the oasis of Vallecito. After recovering from their crossing came the task of building a wagon road 47 miles up to the San Felipe Valley and over Warner Pass in the Laguna Mountains to Warner's Ranch, overcoming the difficult terrain encountered building their road around Box Canyon. From Warner's the battalion marched on existing roads 58 miles northwest through Aguanga and west to Temecula, then southwest to the San Luis Rey River, and west along the river, past Mission San Luis Rey to the Pacific Ocean. The last march was south to Mission San Diego on El Camino Real.

== See also ==
- Southern Emigrant Trail
