= Dragoon Pass =

Gap in Cochise County, Arizona

Coordinates: 32°01′31″N 110°02′44″W

Dragoon Pass is a gap between the Dragoon Mountains and Little Dragoon Mountains in Cochise County, Arizona. The pass lies at an elevation of 4,629 feet (1,411 m).
