= Tres Alamos, Arizona =

Ghost town in Cochise County, Arizona, US

- Ghost town
- Location within Arizona Location within the United States
- Coordinates: 32°03′42″N 110°20′40″W
- Country: United States
- State: Arizona
- County: Cochise
- Founded: 1874
- Abandoned: 1886
- Elevation: 3,440 ft (1,050 m)

Population (2009)
  - Total: 0
- Time zone: UTC-7 (MST (no DST))
- Post Office opened: 1874
- Post Office closed: 1886

Tres Alamos is a ghost town in Cochise County in the U.S. state of Arizona. The town was settled in 1874 in what was then the Arizona Territory.

== History ==
In 1768, Spanish soldiers from the Presidio de Tucson farmed the area along the San Pedro River to supply food for the Presidio. Later, in 1830, Mexican farmers settled in the area, establishing more permanent farming operations and transporting their produce through the Redington Pass to Tucson with the protection of soldiers from the Presidio.

In 1860, the Soza family settled in the area and operated a prosperous cattle ranch. As other Mexicans immigrated from the south the community grew with the building of an adobe chapel called La Capilla de San Antonio de Padua de Lisboa. The community also had a gristmill and built a school for the children of the community.

In 1865, several Anglos from Tucson settled in the area including Billy Ohnesorgen. Ohnesorgen ran a stage stop on what had been the Butterfield Overland Mail route as well as constructed a wooden toll bridge over the San Pedro River. Though farming was productive, the settlers found the Apache raids intolerable, many of the settlers were killed, and they abandoned the area after a few years. With the coming of the Southern Pacific Railroad in 1880 and the establishment of the town of Benson just a couple miles south, and the private construction of a new stage road by J.D. Kinnear that bypassed the Tres Alamos location, the stage stop became superfluous and was abandoned.

The Tres Alamos post office was established in 1874 to serve ranchers along the San Pedro River. The post office was eventually closed in 1886. All of the valley settlements and area surrounding them soon became known as Redington.

== Geography ==
Tres Alamos is located at 32°03′42″N 110°20′40″W, at an elevation of 3,445 feet (1,050 m) above sea level. It is on the eastern flank of the Rincon Mountains east of the city of Tucson at the eastern end of the Redington Pass, which runs between the Santa Catalina Mountains and the Rincon Mountains.
