= Sulphur Springs Valley =

Valley in Cochise County, Arizona

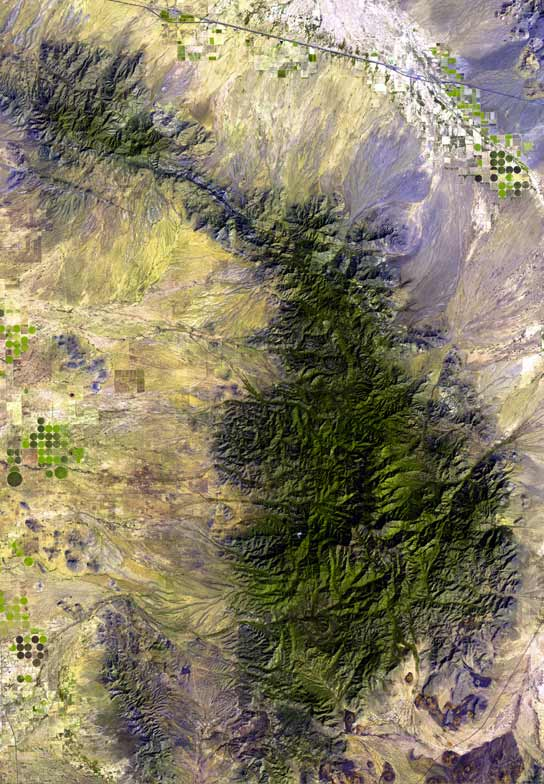
- Sulphur Springs Valley and the Chiricahua Mountains.

- Location within Arizona
- Length: 65 mi (105 km)
- Width: 25 mi (40 km)

Geography
- Location: Cochise County, Arizona, United States
- Population centers: Willcox, AZ-N; Douglas, AZ–Agua Prieta-S
- Borders on: Dos Cabezas Mountains-NE; Chiricahua Mountains-E; Dragoon Mountains-W; Little Dragoon Mountains-NW; Mule Mountains-SW
- Coordinates: 32.4986824°N 110.0309102°W
- Rivers: Willcox Playa
- Interactive map of Sulphur Springs Valley

The Sulphur Springs Valley is a valley in the eastern half of Cochise County, Arizona. The valley covers an approximated vertical rectangle west of the Chiricahua Mountains–Dos Cabezas Mountains complex. The Sulphur Springs Valley is the large flatland to the west.

== Geography ==
The valley gets its name from two sulfur springs located there.

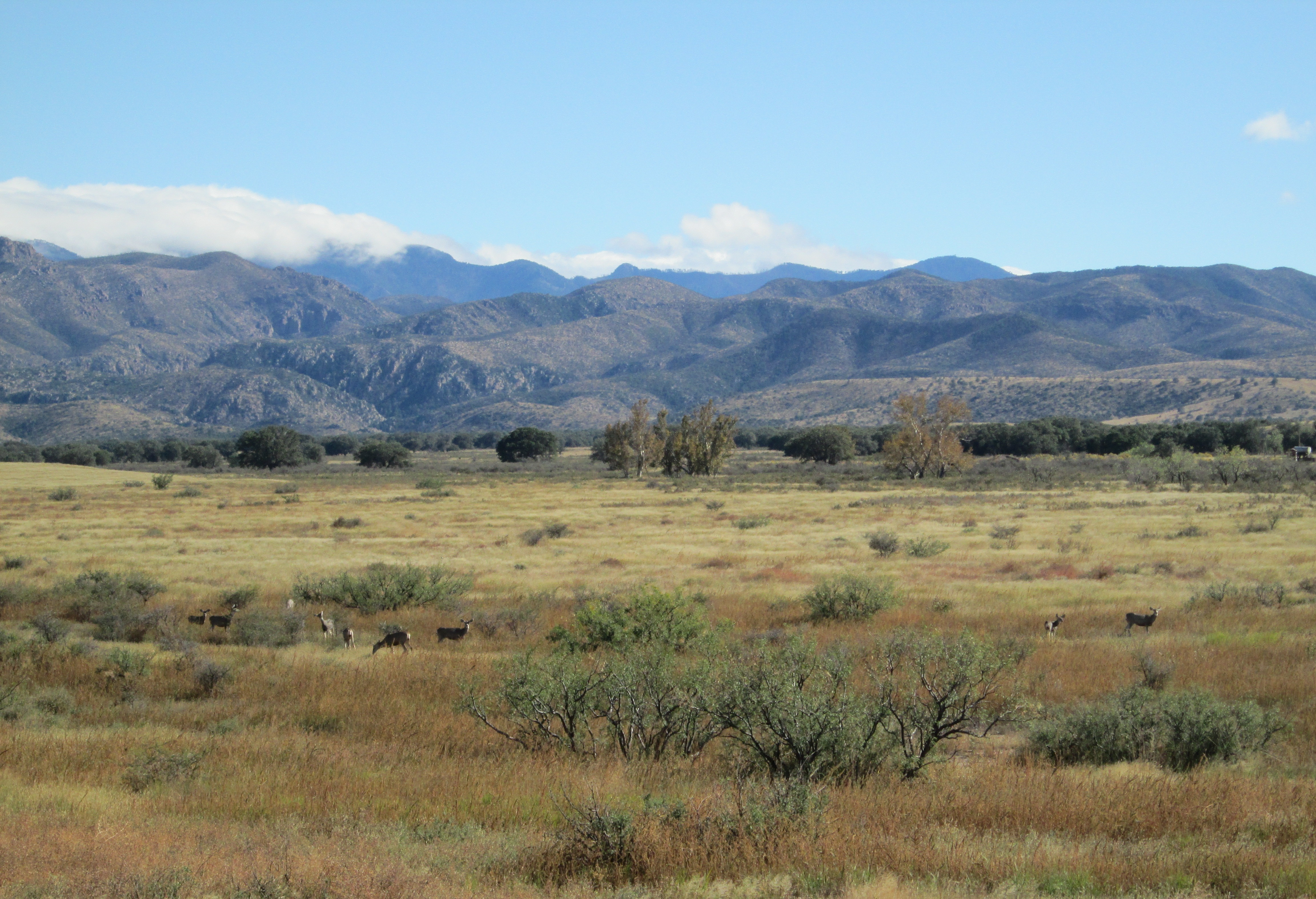
Mule deer in the Sulphur Springs Valley.

Drainage is from north to south, with a moderately sized endorheic basin, named the Willcox Playa, occupying the northern area. The southern portion of the valley drains into Mexico through Douglas, Arizona through Agua Prieta, Sonora, and into the Yaqui River.

During plentiful rain the mountain foothills contain plentiful grasslands. The region is otherwise an arid part of the northeastern Sonoran Desert, influenced by the Chihuahuan Desert just southeast in New Mexico and northwest Chihuahua.

The highest mountain areas of this southeast Arizona section contains Madrean Sky Islands of mountain sky islands. Sulphur Springs Valley is one of the largest and driest subsections in this otherwise mountainous region. From north to south at the west of the valley are the Little Dragoon Mountains, the Dragoons, and the Mule Mountains. The south end of Sulphur Springs Valley also has three small ranges associated with the southern Chiricahua Mountains, the Swisshelm, Pedregosa, and Perella Mountains.

== Transportation ==
The valley is traversed north-south by U.S. Route 191 connecting Douglas, AZ north to Willcox on Interstate 10, at the Willcox Playa. Arizona 181 in the east accesses the west and northwest Chiricahua's, including Chiricahua National Monument. It is connected to Arizona 186 which traverses the southwestern foothills of the Dos Cabezas range.

== Conservation ==
The Southeastern Arizona Bird Observatory is active in Cochise County and all of southeast Arizona, especially in the Willcox Playa, where thousands of sandhill cranes roost. The Sky Island Alliance also has conservancy programs associated with the sky island mountains and their fauna and flora.

== See also ==
- Chiricahua National Monument
- San Rafael Valley
