= Mescal, Arizona =

Unincorporated community in the state of Arizona, United States

- Census-designated place
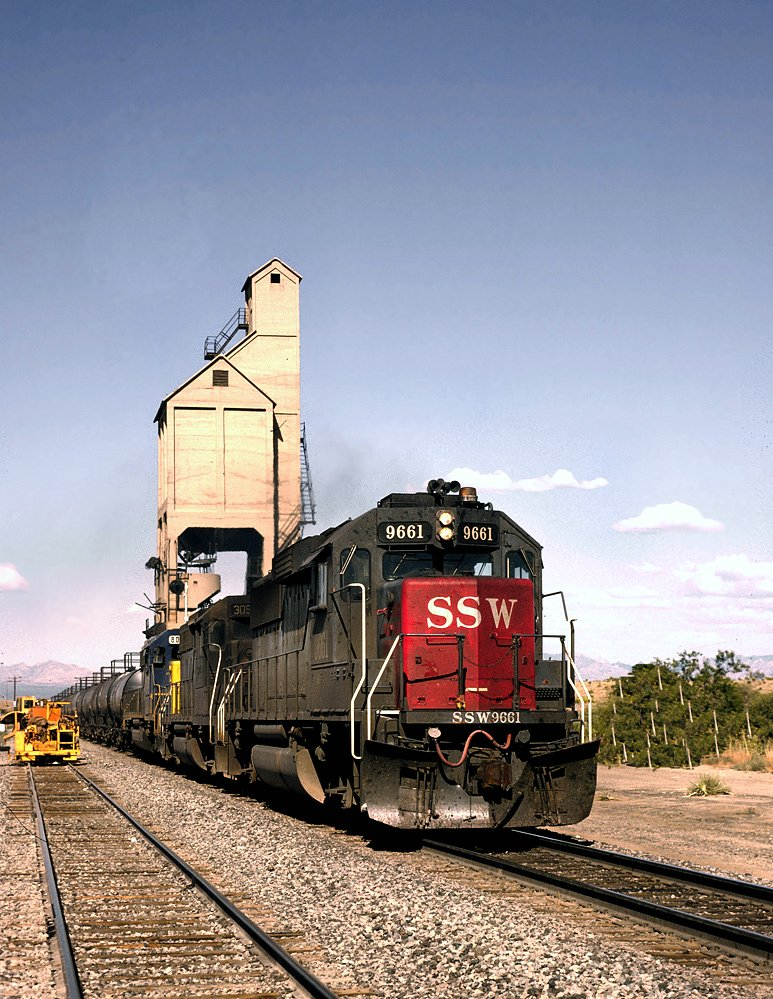
- St. Louis Southwestern 9641 passing through Mescal (1993)

- Location of Mescal in Cochise County, Arizona.

- Location within Arizona Location within the United States
- Coordinates: 31°58′03″N 110°26′12″W
- Country: United States
- State: Arizona
- County: Cochise

Area
  - Total: 4.93 sq mi (12.77 km^{2})
  - Land: 4.93 sq mi (12.76 km^{2})
  - Water: 0.0039 sq mi (0.01 km^{2})
- Elevation: 4,170 ft (1,270 m)

Population (2020)
  - Total: 1,751
  - Density: 355.5/sq mi (137.26/km^{2})
- Time zone: UTC-7 (Mountain (MST))
- ZIP code: 85602
- Area code: 520
- GNIS feature ID: 2582826

Mescal is a census-designated place located in Cochise County, Arizona, United States.

Mescal was originally a populated place, at a rail station on the Southern Pacific Railroad at an elevation of 4,085 feet. The modern community lies to the south of the railroad near Interstate 10, at 4,170 feet. Mescal had a population of 1,812 in the 2010 Census. Mescal had a post office from 1913 until 1931.

== Demographics ==
Historical population
| Census | Pop. | Note | %± |
|---|---|---|---|
| 2010 | 1,812 | | — |
| 2020 | 1,751 | | −3.4% |
U.S. Decennial Census

=== 2020 census ===
As of the 2020 census, Mescal had a population of 1,751. The median age was 53.0 years. 17.8% of residents were under the age of 18 and 28.8% of residents were 65 years of age or older. For every 100 females there were 101.5 males, and for every 100 females age 18 and over there were 104.5 males age 18 and over.

0.0% of residents lived in urban areas, while 100.0% lived in rural areas.

There were 769 households in Mescal, of which 20.0% had children under the age of 18 living in them. Of all households, 50.2% were married-couple households, 19.5% were households with a male householder and no spouse or partner present, and 21.7% were households with a female householder and no spouse or partner present. About 31.9% of all households were made up of individuals and 19.8% had someone living alone who was 65 years of age or older.

There were 858 housing units, of which 10.4% were vacant. The homeowner vacancy rate was 2.7% and the rental vacancy rate was 3.8%.

Racial composition as of the 2020 census
| Race | Number | Percent |
|---|---|---|
| White | 1,406 | 80.3% |
| Black or African American | 13 | 0.7% |
| American Indian and Alaska Native | 18 | 1.0% |
| Asian | 8 | 0.5% |
| Native Hawaiian and Other Pacific Islander | 12 | 0.7% |
| Some other race | 56 | 3.2% |
| Two or more races | 238 | 13.6% |
| Hispanic or Latino (of any race) | 243 | 13.9% |

== Transportation ==
Benson Area Transit provides transportation to Benson two days a week.

== Popular culture ==
The Mescal Movie Set was built in the 1960s. Parts of the movie Tom Horn, starring Steve McQueen, were filmed in Mescal. Other productions filmed in Mescal include Tombstone (1993), The Quick and the Dead (1995) starring Sharon Stone and Leonardo DiCaprio, and Bill O’Reilly's Legends and Lies: The Real West - Doc Holliday (2015).
