= Lime Mountain =

Lime Mountain may refer to:

- Lime Mountain (Maricopa County, Arizona), United States
- Lime Mountain (Elko County, Nevada), United States
- Lime Mountain (Beaver County, Utah), United States
- Lime Mountain (Juab County, Utah), United States

== See also ==
- Lime Peak (Arizona)
