= Mae West Peaks =

Landform in Cochise County, Arizona

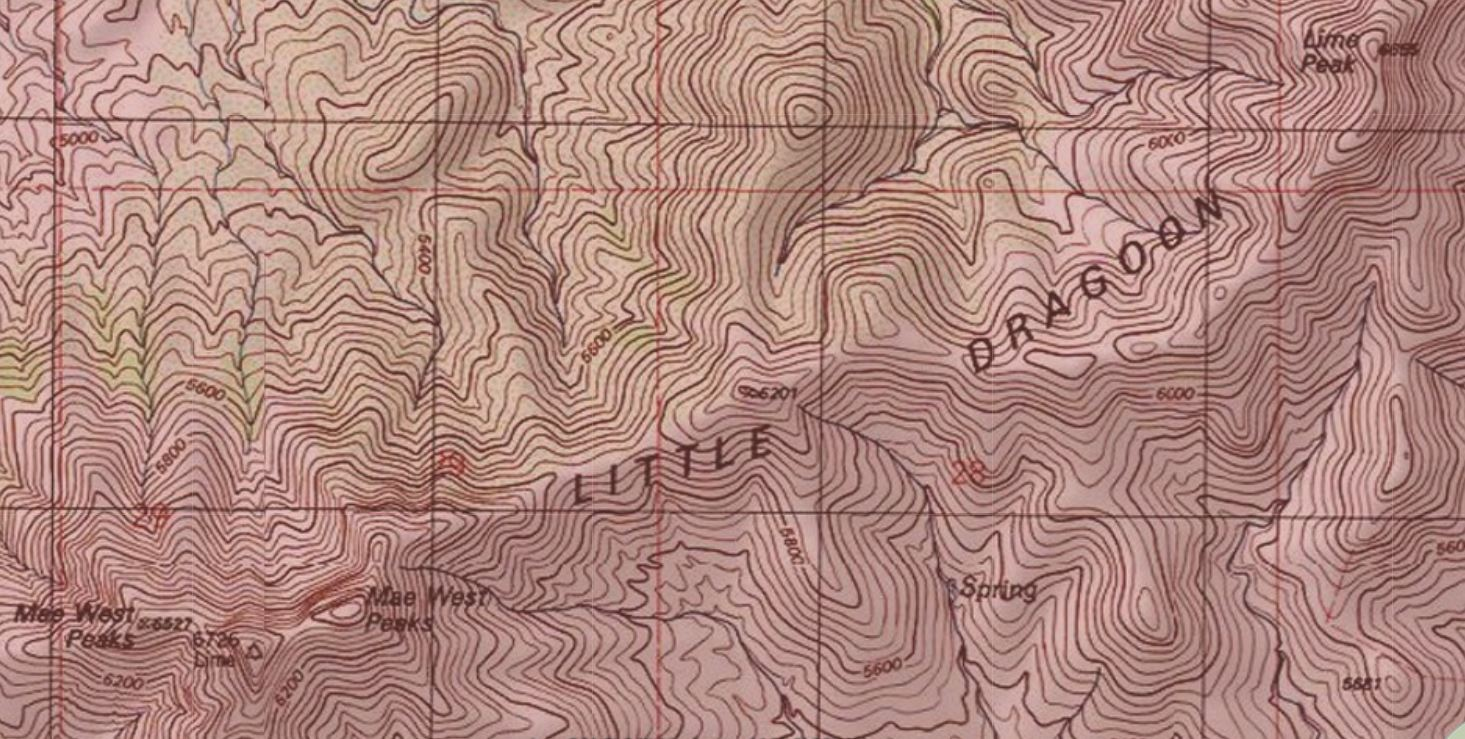
- Portion of the USGS Topographic map of the main ridge of the Little Dragoons with the Mae West Peaks in the lower left corner

Highest point
- Elevation: 6,732 ft (2,052 m) NAVD 88
- Prominence: 2,026 ft (618 m)
- Coordinates: 32°05′53″N 110°07′31″W

Geography
- Location within Arizona Location within the United States
- Location: Cochise County, Arizona, U.S.
- Parent range: Little Dragoon Mountains
- Topo map: USGS Dragoon

Mae West Peaks is a pair of summits in Cochise County, Arizona. The taller of the two was formerly known as Lime Peak and the elevation and coordinates in the infobox refer to this peak. They are in the Little Dragoon Mountains, northwest of Texas Canyon and 3.3 miles (5.3 km) west-southwest of the ghost town of Johnson, Arizona.

These summits were named for their shape, which were thought to be reminiscent of the figure of the actress Mae West.

The 6,655-foot (2,028 m) Lime Peak is 1.8 miles (3 km) to the northeast which is also in the Little Dragoon Mountains.

== See also ==
- Breast-shaped hill
