= Tough Nut =

Tough Nut may refer to:

- Tough Nut (film), 1967 comedy
- Tough Nut Mine, historic silver mine
- Tough Nut Cabaret, 2009 production by Robyn Archer

== See also ==
- Tough Nuts: Australia's Hardest Criminals, Australian television series
- Tuf Nut Historic Commercial District in Little Rock, Arkansas
- "A Tough Nut to Crack", fake working title of the final episode of Seinfeld
