= William Shirley Fulton =

American archaeologist (1880–1964)

William Shirley Fulton, (November 23, 1880 – November 20, 1964), an archeologist and founder of the Amerind Foundation was born in Waterbury, Connecticut. He received a Bachelor of Arts degree from Yale University in 1903.

== Biography ==
Fulton was an executive with the Waterbury Farrel company in Waterbury, Connecticut. His father-in-law was involved with the Copper Chief Mine near Jerome, Arizona.

Several trips to Arizona between 1906 and 1917 permanently captured his interest in the archaeology and ethnology of the American southwest. Throughout the 1920s Fulton regularly traveled in Arizona from his home in New England, exploring the mountains, as well as the canyons and mesa country seeking evidence of past occupation by earlier cultures that had inhabited the area.

On one of his visits he was introduced to Texas Canyon with its unique geology and tales of prehistoric settlements. Fulton purchased about 1,600 acres (6.5 km^{2}) in Texas Canyon calling it the “FF Ranch” in 1930. He built a home in the canyon in 1931.

As early as 1929, Fulton began to excavate archaeological sites on the property in Arizona. Fulton was asked to become a director of the Museum of the American Indian, Heye Foundation in New York City in 1934, and it was under the auspices of this organization that he published his Archaeological Notes on Texas Canyon, Arizona. By 1936, Fulton's collection of ethnographic and archaeological materials had become so large that a small three-room museum and workroom was built on the ranch property to house it.

With the establishment of the Amerind Foundation in 1937, Fulton became fully committed to supporting research into North America's prehistoric past.

With Fulton as director, and with his generous financial support, the Amerind Foundation continued to expand. The Amerind Foundation sponsored several major archaeological excavations in the Southwest and northern Mexico throughout the 1950s, resulting in a number of publications, and in 1959, the Fulton-Hayden Memorial Library and Art Museum became the most recent addition to the burgeoning Amerind Foundation's facilities.

== Awards ==
Around 1960, in honor of his work in the field of archaeology, Fulton received an honorary Doctorate of Humane Letters from Yale University in recognition of his lifelong commitment to archaeological research. An excerpt from that award reads:

When as a young man you began exploring the early history of the Indians of our Southwest, you could not have imagined how far your researches would take you. What began as a hobby has become an outstanding achievement in archaeology and ethnology, not merely of Arizona and Mexico, but of the Indians throughout this hemisphere. Your museum in Arizona is known everywhere by scholars for the range and perfection of its artifacts, for the importance of its publications, and for the generosity and learning of its creator…

== The William Shirley Fulton Scholarship ==
William Shirley Fulton, pioneer Arizona archaeologist and founder of the Amerind Foundation of Dragoon, Arizona, bequeathed the William Shirley Fulton Scholarship. The candidate must be an outstanding undergraduate or graduate student in archaeology. University of Arizona candidates are nominated by the Department of Anthropology subject to the approval of the Dean of the College of Social and Behavioral Sciences and the Office of Student Financial Aid.
