= Schieffelin Hall =

- U.S. National Historic Landmark District – Contributing property
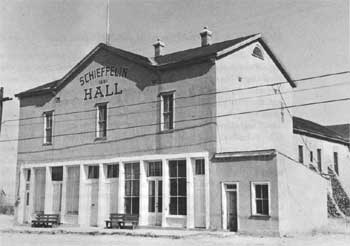
- Schieffelin Hall

- Location within Arizona
- Location: 215 N 5th St., Tombstone, Arizona
- Coordinates: 31°42′50″N 110°3′59″W
- Built: 1881
- Built by: Albert Schieffelin and William Harwood
- Architectural style: Adobe construction
- Part of: Tombstone Historic District (ID66000171)
- Designated NHLDCP: July 4, 1961

Schieffelin Hall is a historic building in Tombstone, Arizona. Constructed during the period of the American Old West, it is the largest standing historic adobe structure still existent in the United States southwest. There are other adobe structures, which predate the Arizona Territory, including houses dating from 1000 in Taos and Santa Fe, New Mexico. It was built in 1881 by Albert Schieffelin, brother of Tombstone founder Ed Schieffelin, and William Harwood as a first class opera house, theater, recital hall, and a meeting place for Tombstone citizens.

== History ==
When the hall opened on the corner of Fremont and Fourth Streets on June 8, 1881, it seated 450 on the floor and 125 more in the gallery. The stage drop curtain was painted with a scene from Colorado and was considered a work of art. The building was the center for city entertainment and social events in Tombstone with formal balls and theatrical performances. When it opened, it was "the largest, most elaborate theater between El Paso, Texas and San Francisco, California." The first play, Tom Taylor's five-act drama, The Ticket-of-Leave Man, was staged on September 15, 1881. The Hall was scorched by a large fire that burned many blocks in 1882.

Schieffelin, his brother Ed, and their mining engineer partner Richard Gird formed a partnership, shaking hands on a three-way deal that was never put down on paper. The company they formed, the Tombstone Gold and Silver Mining Company, held title to the claims and worked the mines. They brought in two big strikes, the Lucky Cuss and the Tough Nut. The company produced millions of dollars of wealth for the three owners.

Along with the other claims, the three men owned a piece of the Grand Central mining claim which they shared with Hank Williams and John Oliver. The Schieffelin called their claim The Contention because of the many harsh words and legal fights over the legality of Williams and Oliver's claim. In early 1880, Gird lined up buyers for their interest in the Contention which they sold for $10,000. It would later yield millions in silver. They also sold a half-interest in the Lucky Cuss, and the other half turned into a steady stream of money. Later in 1880, Al and Ed Schieffelin sold their two-thirds interest in the Tough Nut for $1 million each to investors from Philadelphia, and sometime later Gird sold his one-third interest for the same amount. Al Schieffelin used a portion of his wealth to build Schieffelin Hall.

On March 14, 1881, one of five founding Masonic Lodges in Arizona, King Solomon Lodge #5, was organized in a suite of upstairs rooms, which became the Masonic Hall. Justice of the Peace Wells Spicer, who figured prominently in exonerating the Earps and Doc Holliday of murdering Cowboys during the Gunfight at the O.K. Corral, was the first Master of the lodge.

== Construction ==
The main entrance on Fourth Street is 119 feet (36 m) long and 59 feet (18 m) long. The adobe walls are 16 inches (410 mm) thick. Overall, the building is 40 feet (12 m) tall. The main entrance is a 12 feet (3.7 m) high and 30 feet (9.1 m) long that gives access to the 39 by 59 feet (12 by 18 m) auditorium with a seating capacity on the main floor of 450, and a gallery capacity of 125. The stage is 30 by 59 feet (9.1 by 18.0 m). The curtain width of the stage is 24 feet (7.3 m) wide and 21 feet (6.4 m) high. The scenery loft is 16 feet (4.9 m) high.

The building facing Fremont Street is 59 feet (18 m) long has a secondary entrance. The first story is 14 feet (4.3 m) high and 30 feet (9.1 m) deep. The second story is 16 feet (4.9 m) high and contains a 27 by 41 feet (8.2 by 12.5 m) Masonic Hall with three small ante-rooms.

== Restoration ==
Investors from Detroit, Michigan, led by attorney Harold O. Love, bought the O.K. Corral, along with The Tombstone Epitaph, the Crystal Palace Hotel, and Schieffelin Hall in 1964.

Schieffelin Hall hadn't been maintained since 1917, and in 1963 it was restored and renovated by Historic Tombstone Adventures, which was formed to preserve many of the town's landmarks. On October 15, 1966, it was placed on the National Register of Historic Places, and in 1979 Historic Tombstone Adventures deeded it to the city. During 1990–1994, portions of the exterior were restored, the foundation was stabilized, window frames were replaced, and the outside was painted. In 1999, the adobe walls were repaired, the lobby and auditorium floors were refinished, and the rear of the building was covered with a metal roof. In 2015, the Arizona Department of Transportation undertook a project to replace sidewalk in a three-block area in front of the historic Schieffelin Hall and to rebuild a porch on the front of the building that has been missing for many years. The restorers manufactured 300 bricks using original techniques to match the original construction.

== Current uses ==
As of 2015, the building is used for plays, city council meetings, local social gatherings, fundraisers and theatrical performances. It remains the home of the King Solomon Lodge #5. The building is a contributing property to the Tombstone Historic District, which was listed on the National Register of Historic Places on October 15, 1966.

Al Schieffelin's great-niece Mary Schieffelin Brady reopened the hall in 1964 and it remains an attraction in Tombstone. It is the largest standing adobe structure in the southwest United States.

== Gallery ==
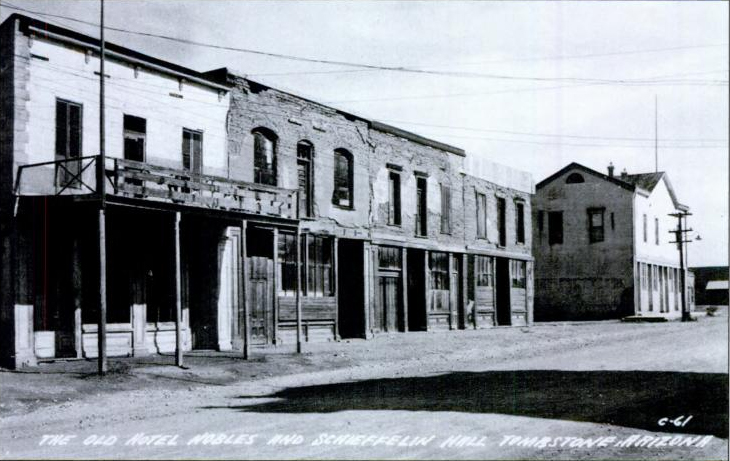
The Gird Block Building at left in 1880. Schiefflin Hall is to the right.

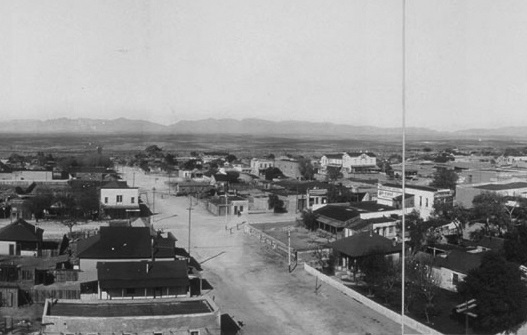
Schieffelin Hall, the large white building, in 1908 from the roof of the county courthouse

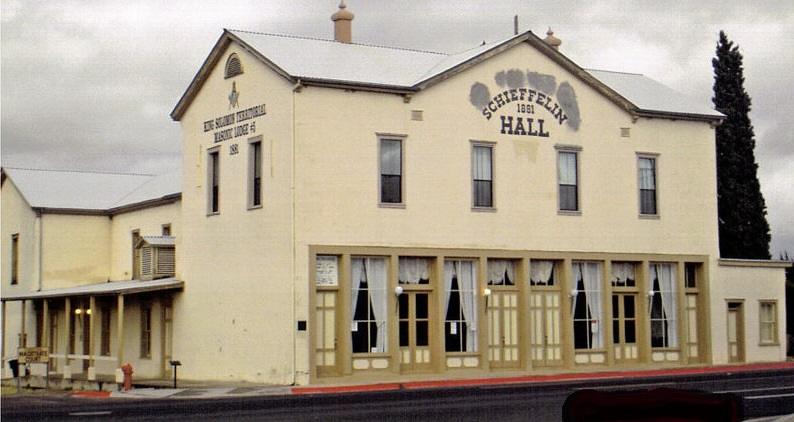
Schiefflin Hall as it currently appears
