= Mount Glenn =

Landform in Cochise County, Arizona

- Location within Arizona Location within the United States

Highest point
- Elevation: 7,523 ft (2,293 m) NAVD 88
- Prominence: 2,840 ft (866 m)
- Coordinates: 31°57′08″N 109°59′13″W

Geography
- Location: Cochise County, Arizona, U.S.
- Parent range: Dragoon Mountains
- Topo map: USGS Cochise Stronghold

Climbing
- Easiest route: Hike

Mount Glenn, is in the Coronado National Forest, about 75 miles (121 km) east of Tucson, Arizona. The summit, in Cochise County, is the highest point in the Dragoon Mountains and is a popular local hiking destination.

Mount Glenn was named around 1888 after Calvin Glenn, who was a manager for the Chiricahua Cattle Co. at the time.

== See also ==
- List of mountains and hills of Arizona by height
