= Lime Peak (Arizona) =

Landform in Cochise County, Arizona

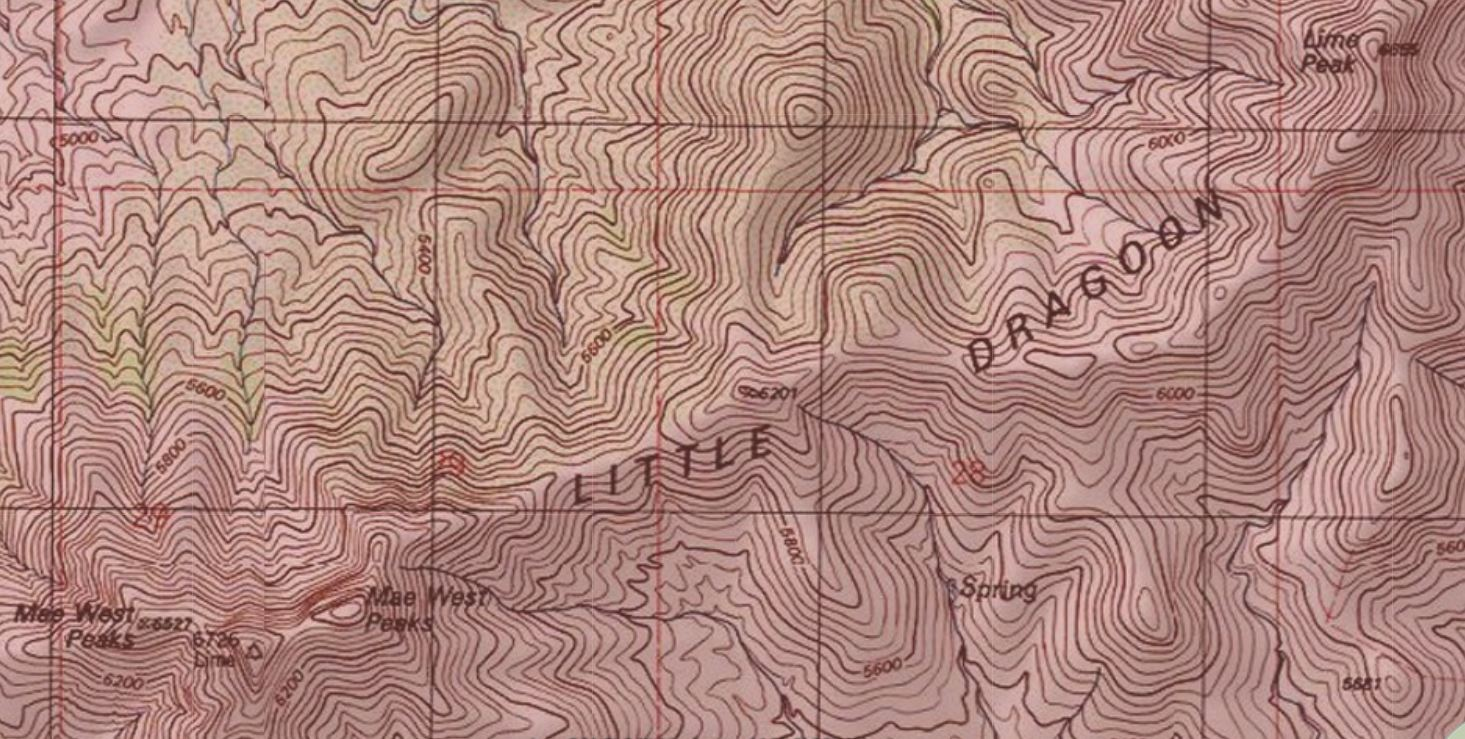
- Topographic map of the ridge of the Little Dragoon Mountains with Lime Peak in the upper right corner.

Highest point
- Elevation: 6,658 ft (2,029 m) NAVD 88
- Prominence: 695 ft (212 m)
- Coordinates: 32°06′43″N 110°05′40″W

Geography
- Location within Arizona
- Location: Cochise County, Arizona, U.S.
- Parent range: Little Dragoon Mountains
- Topo map: USGS Dragoon

Lime Peak is a summit in Cochise County, Arizona, north of Interstate 10 between Benson and Willcox and 6.6 miles (11 km) northwest of Dragoon, Arizona. It is one of three named peaks in the Little Dragoon Mountains. Two of the peaks are named the Mae West Peaks since their appearance was thought to be reminiscent of the figure of the actress Mae West.

In 1935 the United States Coast and Geodetic Survey referred to the tallest of the Mae West peaks as Lime. In 1984 the U.S. Board on Geographic Names officially assigned the name Lime Peak to its current location. It had also been known as Johnson Peak.
