= Dragoon, Arizona =

Unincorporated community in the state of Arizona, United States

- Census-designated place
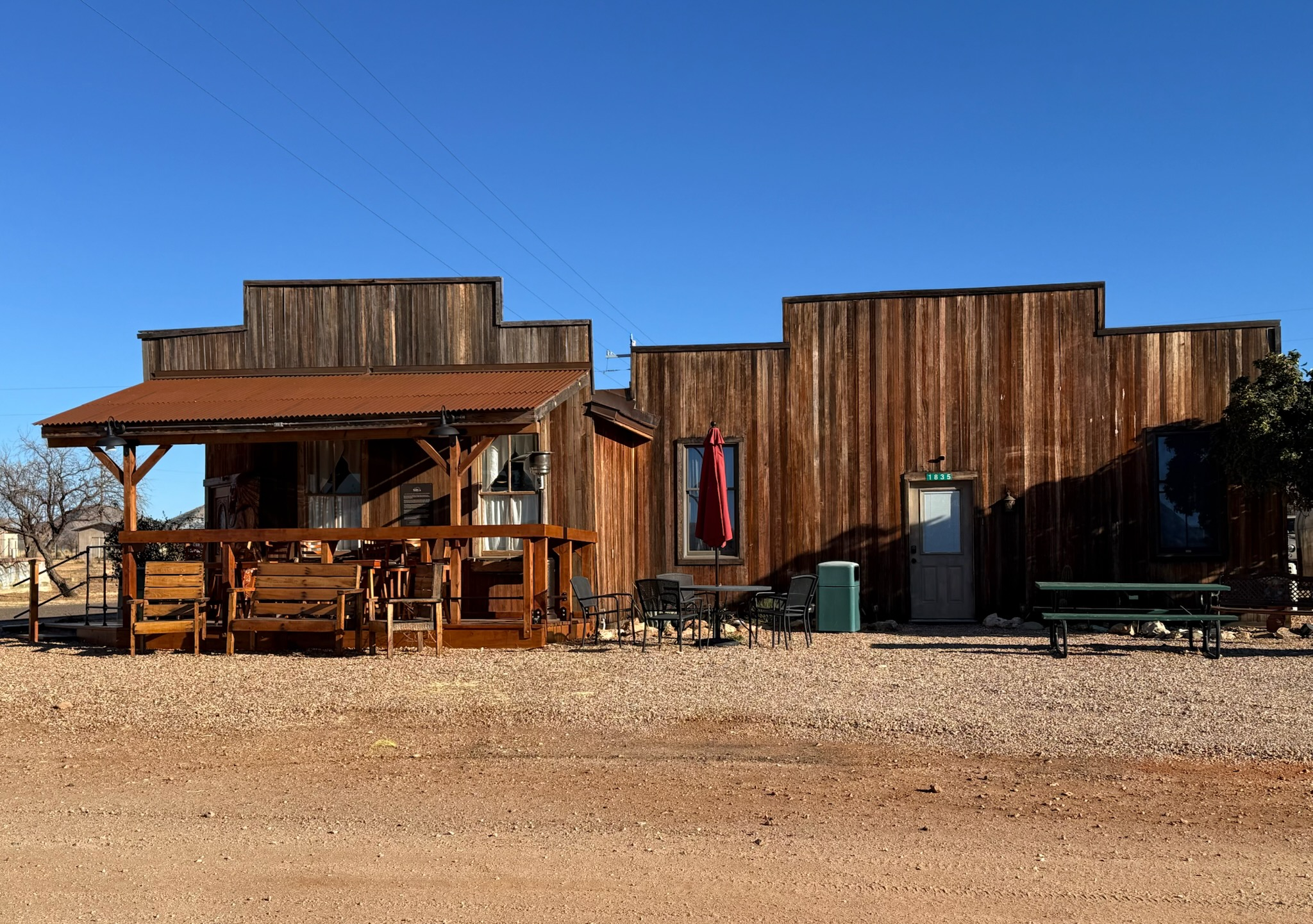
- J. H. Smith Grocery Store and Filling Station listed in the National Register of Historic Places. DragoonArizona . com

- Location of Dragoon in Cochise County, Arizona.

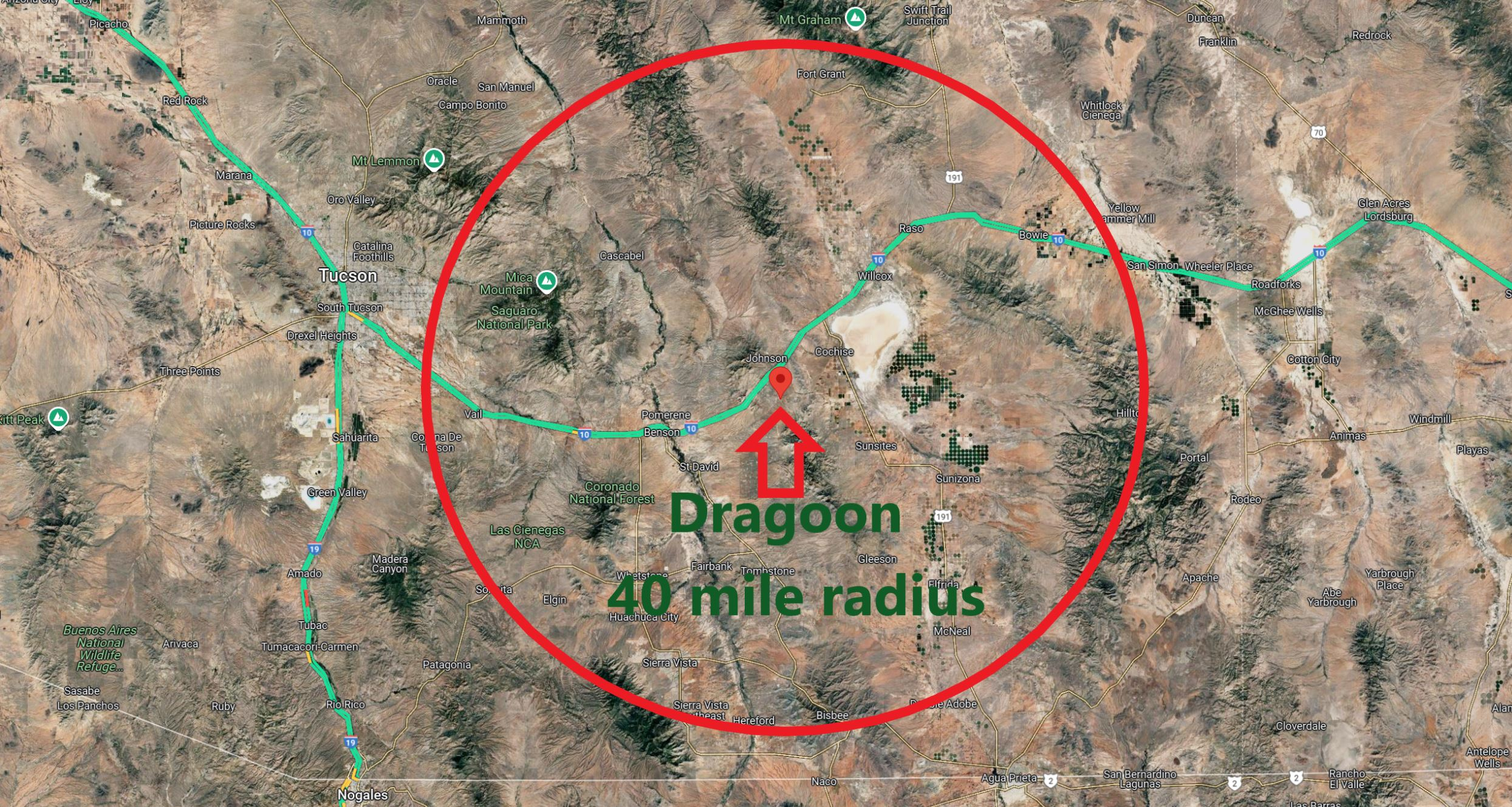

- Location within Arizona Location within the United States
- Coordinates: 32°01′37″N 110°02′18″W
- Country: United States
- State: Arizona
- County: Cochise

Area
  - Total: 1.96 sq mi (5.07 km^{2})
  - Land: 1.96 sq mi (5.07 km^{2})
  - Water: 0 sq mi (0.00 km^{2})
- Elevation: 4,623 ft (1,409 m)

Population (2020)
  - Total: 178
  - Density: 90.9/sq mi (35.09/km^{2})
- Time zone: UTC-7 (Mountain (MST))
- ZIP code: 85609
- Area code: 520
- GNIS feature ID: 2582774
- Website: www.DragoonArizona.com

Dragoon is an unincorporated community and census-designated place (CDP) in Cochise County, Arizona, United States. As of the 2020 census, it had a population of 178. Dragoon is 17 miles (27 km) east-northeast of the city of Benson, and about 57 miles (92 km) southeast of Tucson, Arizona. Dragoon has the ZIP code of 85609.

== Demographics ==
Historical population
Census	Pop.	Note	%±
2010	209		—
2020	178		−14.8%
U.S. Decennial Census

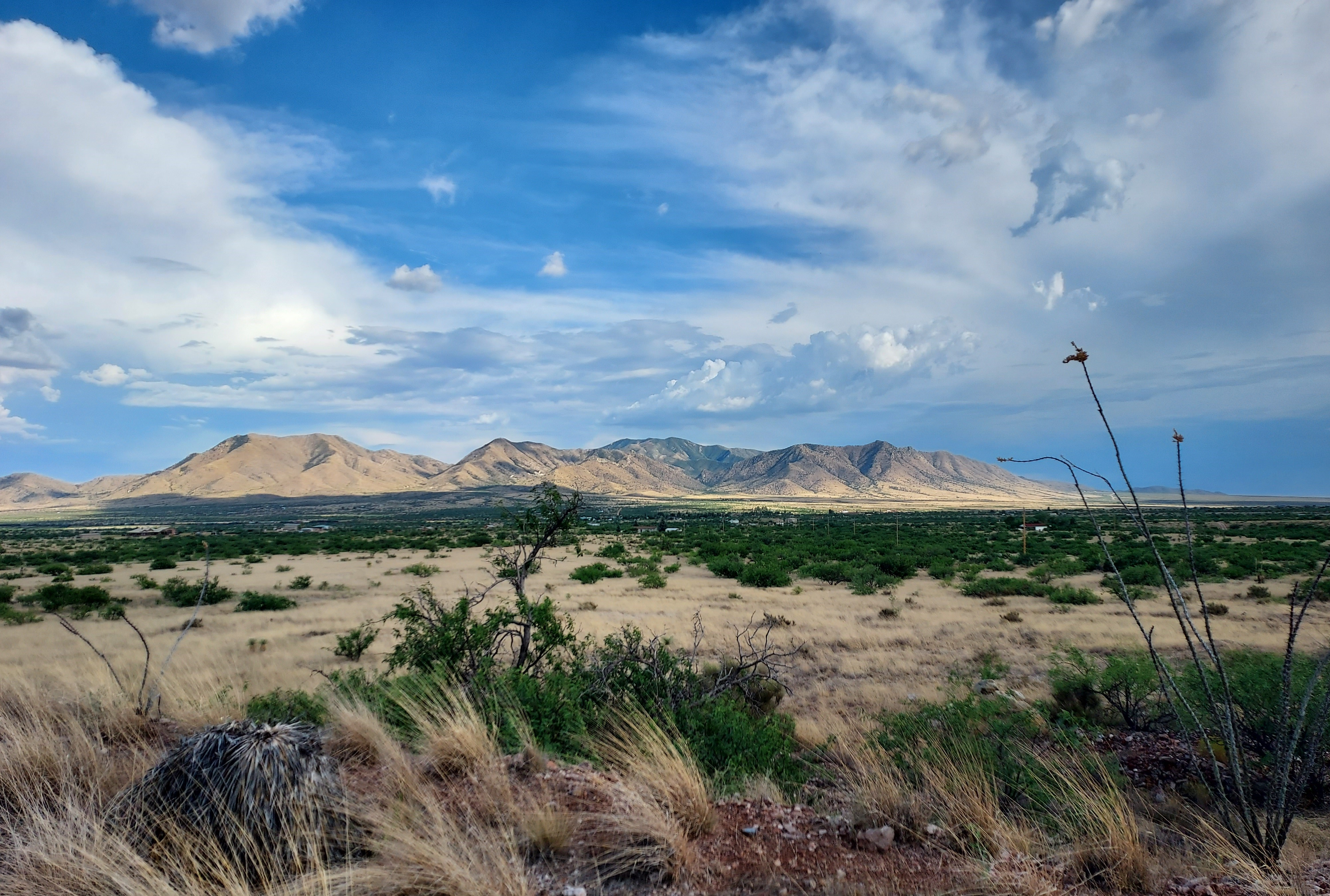

The Dragoon zip code holds a little more than 500 residents. The census designated area of Dragoon is significantly smaller than the Dragoon zip code area.

== Geography and climate ==
The community lies along the Union Pacific Railroad between the Dragoon Mountains to the southeast and the Little Dragoon Mountains to the northwest. Interstate 10 passes through the Texas Canyon area approximately three miles to the west of the village.

Dragoon's Texas Canyon is so regionally unique that it inspired a series of souvenir postcards of which vintage cards can still be found today on ebay.

According to the Köppen Climate Classification system, Dragoon has a semi-arid climate, abbreviated "BSk" on climate maps.

Dragoon is in an area known as the Sky Island in the United States and is a high mountain valley ranging in elevation from 4,500 to 5,000 ft. The proper name for Sky Islands is Madrean Archipelago which covers an area of approximately 40,536 km2 (15,651 mi2) in southeastern Arizona and southwestern New Mexico. The ecoregion is bounded on the west by the Sonoran Basin and Range Ecoregion, on the east by the Chihuahuan Deserts Ecoregion, and on the north by the Arizona/New Mexico Mountains Ecoregion. This area of basin-and-range topography is one of the most biologically diverse in the world. Although the mountains in the ecoregion bridge the Rocky Mountains to the north and the Sierra Madre Occidental in Mexico to the south, the lower elevations act as a barrier to species dispersal. Nevertheless, the geographic convergence of these two major continental mountain ranges, as well as of the Chihuahuan Desert to the east and the Sonoran Desert to the west, forms the foundation for ecological interactions found nowhere else on Earth. The two subregions of the Madrean Archipelago specific to Dragoon are the Apachian Valleys and Low Hills ecoregion and the Lower Madrean Woodlands.

== History ==
It is now suspected that Coronado and his expedition traveled through Dragoon Pass. World renowned Archeologist Deni Seymour’s ongoing work continues to support this statement. She has also located previously unknown Chichilticale and San Geronimo III, one of which is in close proximity to Dragoon.

Battles of Dragoon Springs: Before train/auto and plane travel, Dragoon Springs was the only reliable year-round water source for a day of travel in any direction. Therefore, it became a crossroads for travelers and often caused conflict between those travelers that even ended in bloodshed and outright battles.

Dragoon Springs is also home to the best preserved Butterfield Overland Stagecoach Station that is part of the newly designated Butterfield National Historic Trail. It was recently scored highest by the National Park Service amongst all Butterfield stations in Arizona. The station, built by Butterfield, only served Butterfield for less than 4 years but served many other stagecoach lines and travelers for decades.

Dragoon Pass was the major geographical reason for the Gadsden Purchase.

Peace Treaty – The only enemy combatant to have never been beat by the US Military is none other than the Cochise County’s namesake Apache Chief Cochise. For 12 years he fought his war that ended in a peace treaty which created the Chiricahua Indian Reservation.

The Chiricahua Indian Reservation existed from 1872 to 1876 for which Dragoon served as the gateway as it was located on the edge of the reservation being located at the northern foot of the Dragoon Mountains.

WWII

During WWII, the US Military created an Internment Camp for Japanese dignitaries in Dragoon at Triangle T Dude Ranch.

During WWII, the US Border Patrol was the enforcement agency in Dragoon for the Japanese Internment Camp.

Japanese spy interrogation of Takeo Yoshikawa, then known by his spy name as Tadashi Morimura, happened in Dragoon at Triangle T Ranch. He was the Pearl Harbor spy that facilitated the attack on Pearl Harbor.

FBI

A 1942 FBI memorandum indicates that a group of 23 Japanese diplomats were held in Dragoon during the Second World War. On June 7th, the Chicago Tribune had reported news concerning ongoing war efforts, and the FBI was concerned whether interned Japanese diplomats would realize from this news reporting that Japanese military codes had been broken. Their memorandum concluded that the Japanese who were held at Dragoon did not have access to media sources during the relevant time period. An excerpt from the memorandum is quoted as follows:

Excerpt of Memorandum for the Attorney General from the Federal Bureau of Investigation, dated JUL-9 1942 Declassified Authority NND76716

"There were twenty-three Japanese diplomats at Dragoon, Arizona, and all of this group had formerly been stationed in the Hawaiian Islands. Special Agent Wells Bailey of the State Department accompanied them when they left Arizona and was with them until their arrival in New York City on June 10, 1942. They were immediately taken to the Pennsylvania Hotel in New York City and were held incommunicado until they were taken aboard the SS Gripsholm on June 13, 1942. Agent Bailey can testify to the fact that this group was not allowed to see any newspapers whatsoever during the time they were in Arizona and while they were en route to New York City. He can also testify to the fact that this group was placed aboard the SS Gripsholm on June 13, 1942."

Train Derailment

In 1973 a train explosion caused a derailment that happened just downhill from Dragoon Pass. Brakes overheated causing sparks to ignite a train car floor impregnated with flammable chemistry. The resulting explosion left a huge crater and totally or partially destroyed 113 of the rail cars. The car that caught fire was carrying MK 82 Navy bombs.

== Local Businesses ==
Dragoon General Store had gone through extensive renovations. This store is not open to the public at this time and is pending numerous permits from the county.

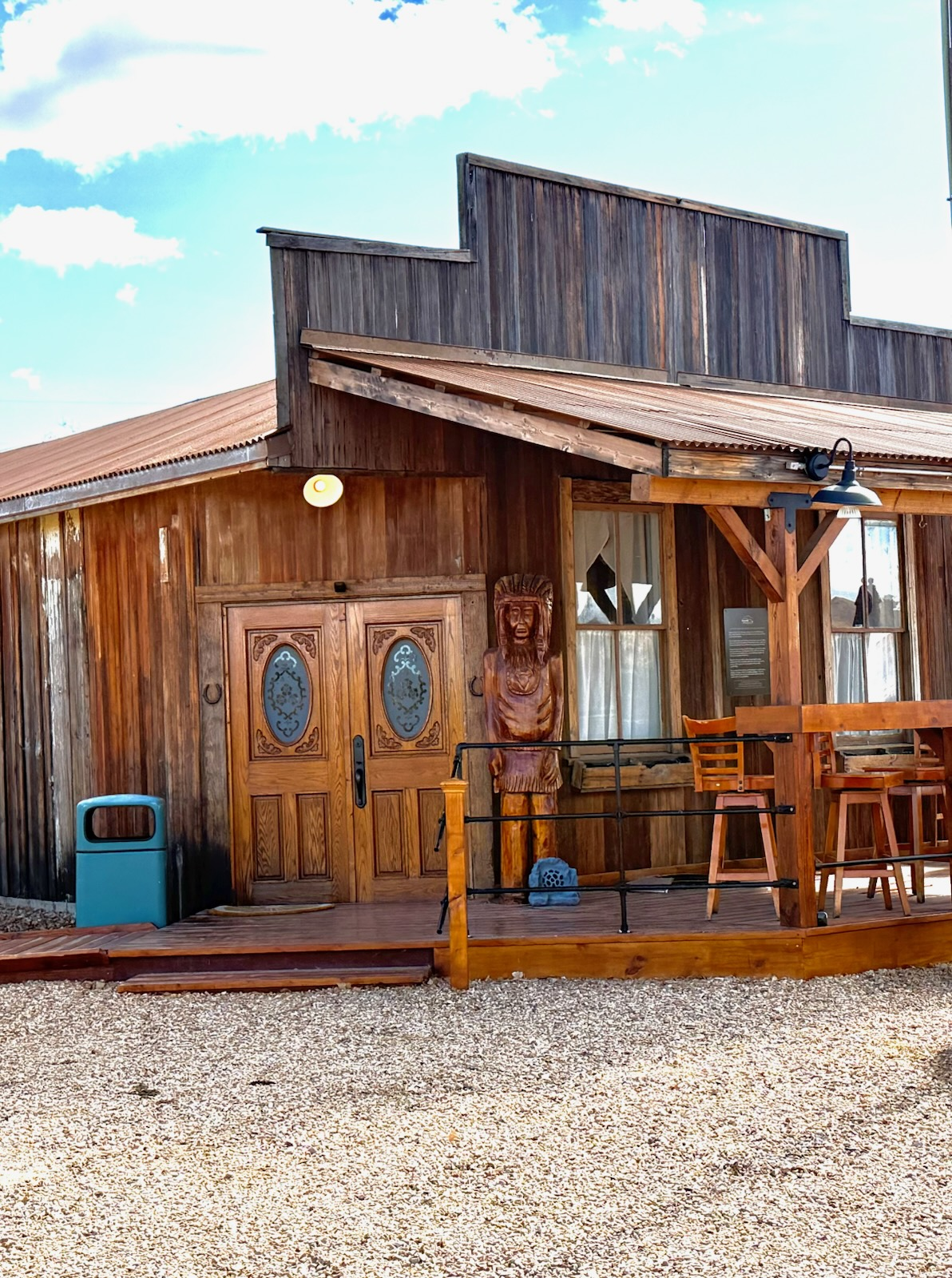
New General Store entrance!

Dragoon hospitality offers over 30 beds for travelers in the form of Airbnbs and Guest Ranches. It is also home to the Amerind Foundation that works to document, preserve and protect Native American culture. Dragoon has many local businesses and has had a healthy historical mining industry as well as current modern copper mining.

Dance hall in the sky? Dragoon once was home to the only dance hall in Arizona built on a huge rock. It was named "Skyline" and opened June of 1934. It didn't last long though as the 150 stair steps up and down became a safety issue as did the propensity of patrons to try and get down without using the stairs.
