= Johnson, Arizona =

- Populated place
- Location within the state of Arizona Johnson (the United States)
- Coordinates: 32°06′11″N 110°03′58″W
- Country: United States
- State: Arizona
- County: Cochise
- Elevation: 4,977 ft (1,517 m)
- Time zone: UTC-7 (Mountain (MST))
  - Summer (DST): UTC-7 (MST)
- Area code: 520
- FIPS code: 04-36360
- GNIS feature ID: 6470

Johnson is a populated place situated in Cochise County, Arizona, United States, on the east side of the Little Dragoon Mountains.

== History ==
The location began as a mining camp, and a post office was established there in 1900, with William De H. Washington as its postmaster. The post office closed in 1929.

Johnson's population was 317 in 1902.
