= Amerind Foundation =

Native American museum and research facility in Dragoon, Cochise County, Arizona

Coordinates: 32.046°N 110.079°W

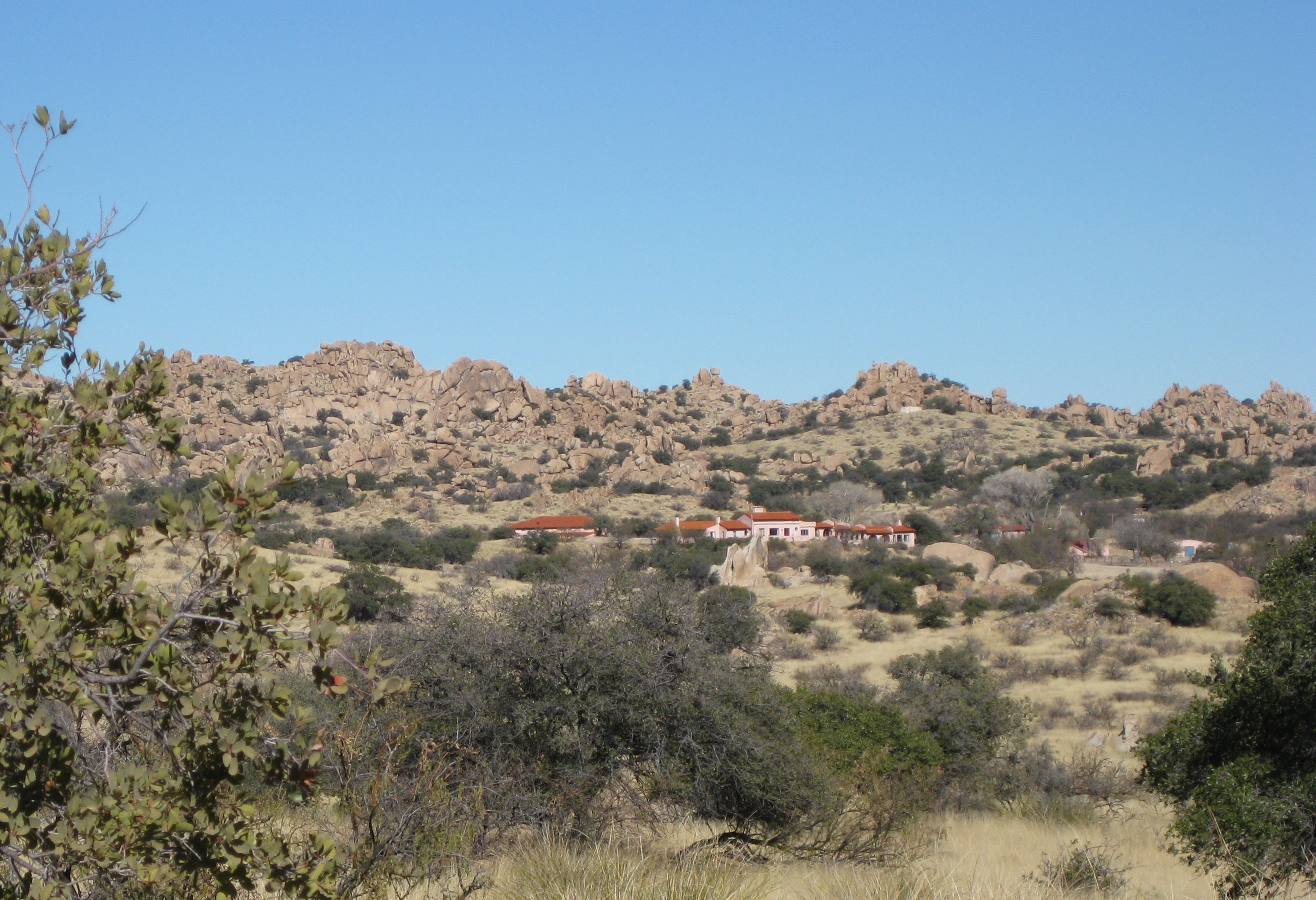
Amerind Foundation, view in Texas Canyon

The Amerind Foundation is a museum and research facility dedicated to the preservation and interpretation of Native American cultures and their histories. Its facilities are located near the village of Dragoon in Cochise County, Arizona, about 65 miles east of Tucson in Texas Canyon.

According to the Foundation's literature, "Amerind" is a contraction of the words "American" and "Indian".

== History ==
William Shirley Fulton (1880–1964), a businessman, investor, and archaeologist, established the Amerind Foundation in 1937.

== Building ==
The Amerind Foundation's building was designed by Tucson architect Merritt Starkweather and contains one of the finest collections of archaeological and ethnological artifacts in the country as well as a sizable research library.

== Museum exhibits ==
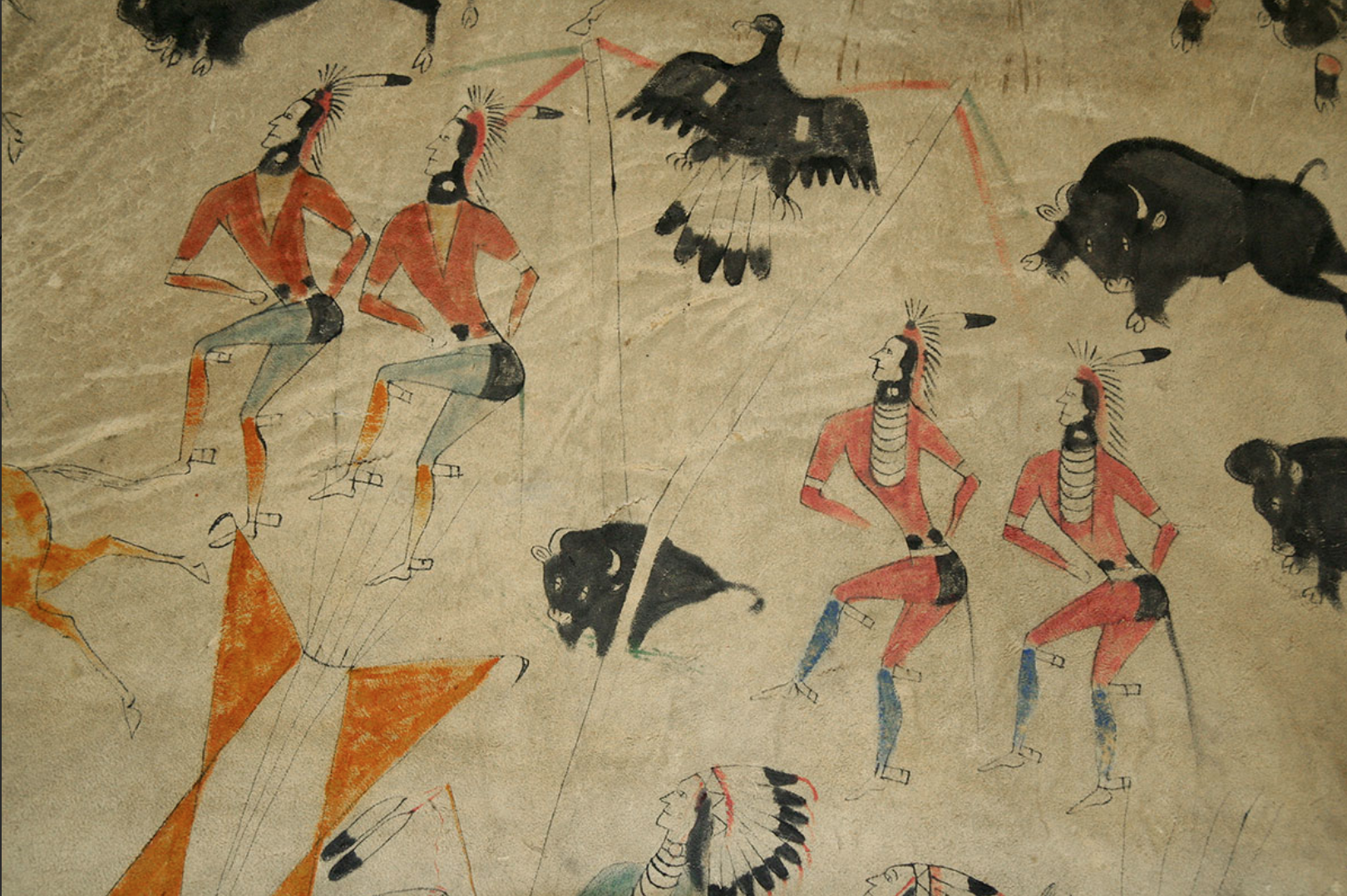
Detail of a 19th-century elk hide Story robe painted by the Shoshoni artist Cotsiogo, on display at Amerind

The museum's permanent exhibits include archaeological artifacts from the Amerind property by founder William Shirley Fulton and later by director Charles C. Di Peso, as well as items found at Di Peso at Casas Grandes, Chihuahua, Mexico and other excavations. The objects include weapons, tools, baskets, sandals, cordage of human hair, and cloth.

There are ethnographic items from different indigenous peoples ranging from Alaska to South America. Items on display include jewelry, baskets, weapons, cradle boards, religious artifacts, figurative items, ceramics and pottery, and art.

=== Art gallery ===
The Fulton-Hayden Memorial Art Gallery features paintings by 20th century Anglo and Native American artists.

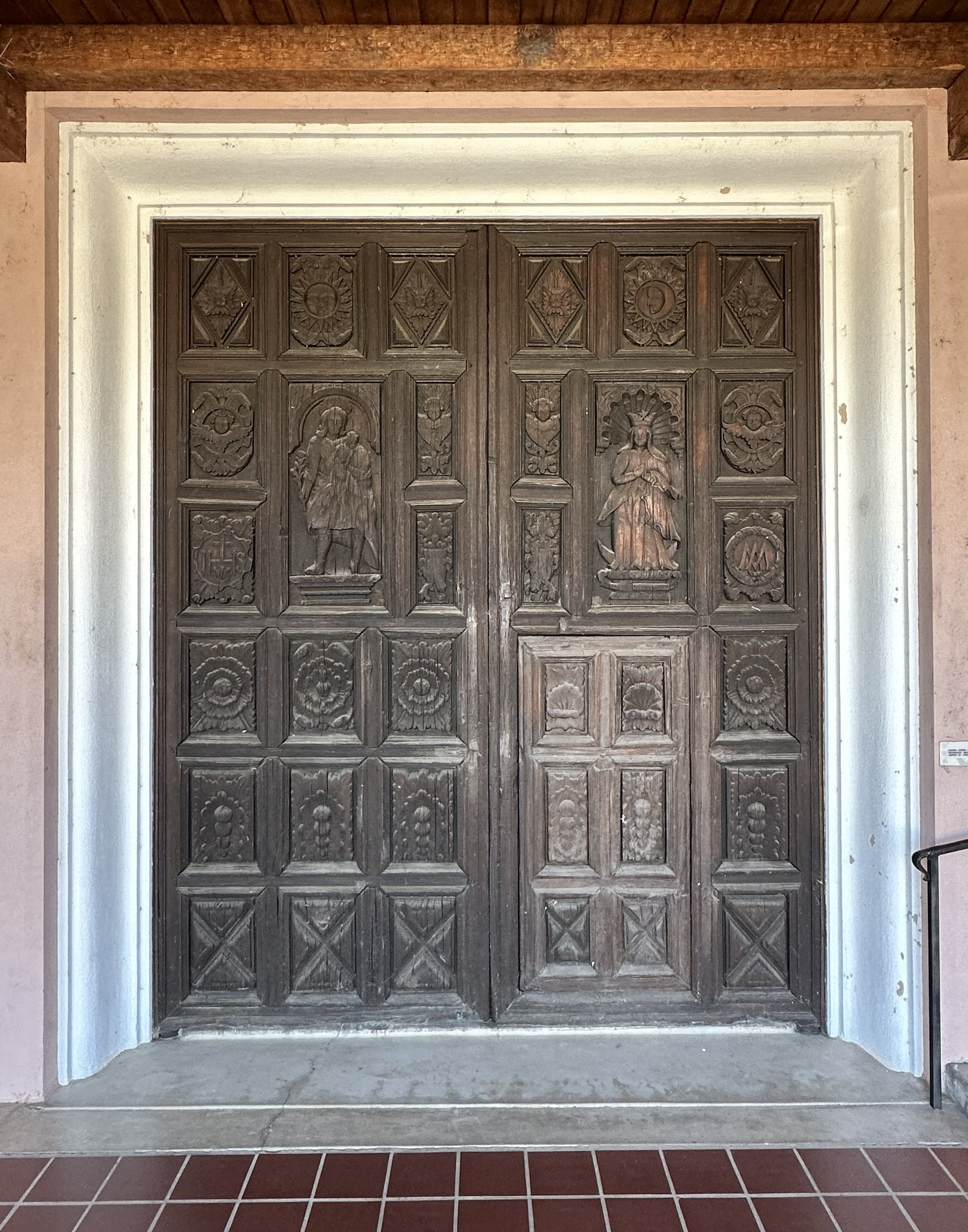
The Fulton-Hayden Memorial Art Gallery doors are church doors from a chapel in Michoacán, Mexico. A.D 1665. Carved by Tarascan wood carvers.

=== Texas Canyon Nature Preserve ===
The preserve is part of the 1,900-acre campus that includes the Amerind Museum. More than six miles of trails wind past balanced granite rocks carved by wind, rain and time.

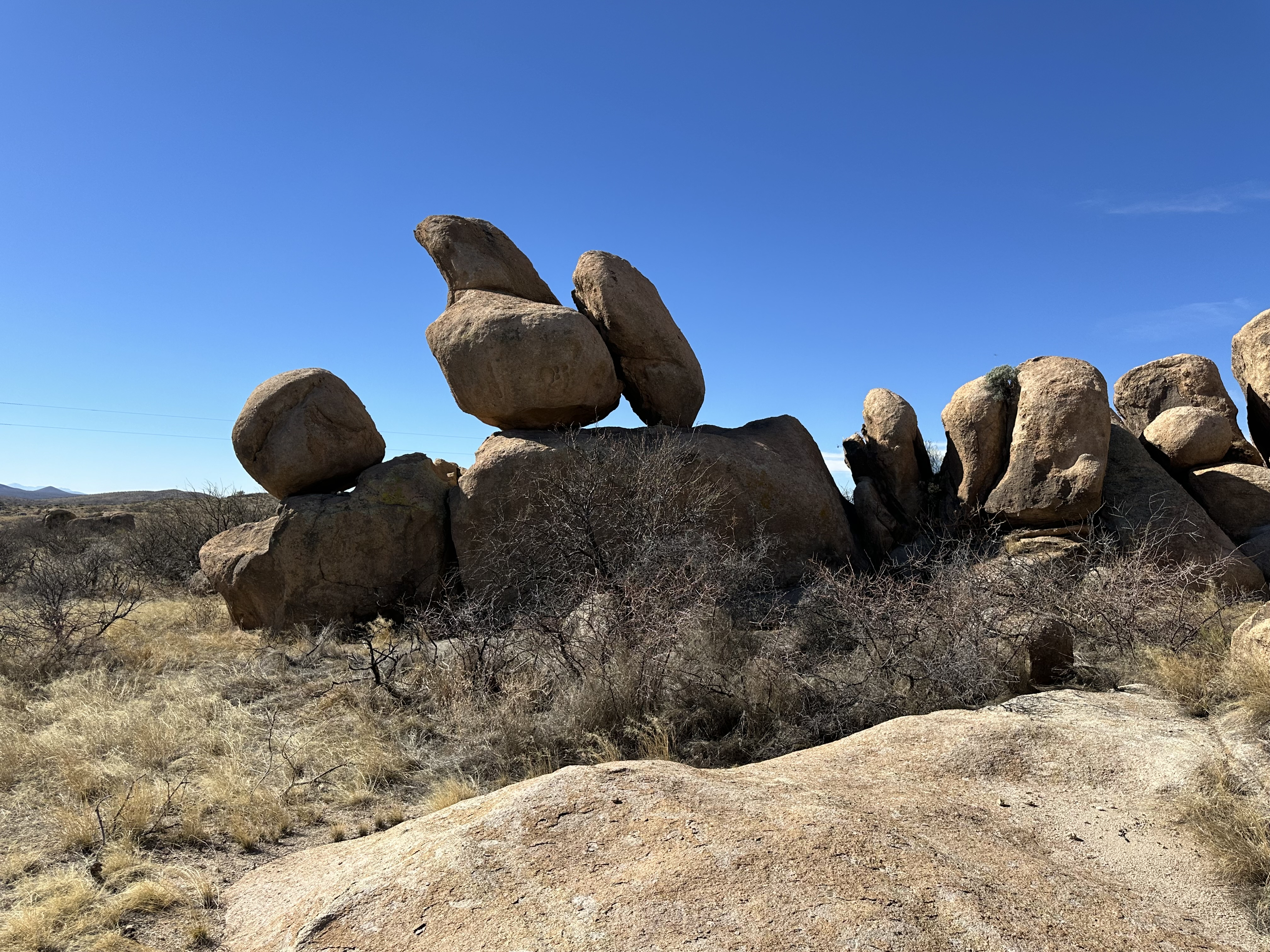
Texas Canyon Nature Preserve

== Published works ==
- Archaeological Notes on Texas Canyon, Arizona, by William Shirley Fulton. Museum of the American Indian, Heye Foundation, Vols. 1–3. 1934–1938. New York. (out of print)
- An Archaeological Site Near Gleeson, Arizona, by William Shirley Fulton and Carr Tuthill. Amerind Foundation Publication No. 1. 1940. (out of print)
- A Ceremonial Cave in the Winchester Mountains, Arizona, by William Shirley Fulton. Amerind Foundation Publication No. 2. 1941. (out of print)
- Painted Cave in Northeastern Arizona, by Emil W. Haury. Amerind Foundation Publication No. 3. 1945. (out of print)
- The Tres Alamos Site on the San Pedro River, Southeastern Arizona, by Carr Tuthill. Amerind Foundation Publication No. 4. 1947. (out of print)
- The Babocomari Village Site on the Babocomari River, Southeastern Arizona, by Charles C. Di Peso. Amerind Foundation Publication No. 5. 1951. (out of print)
- The Sobaipuri Indians of the Upper San Pedro Valley, Southeastern Arizona, by Charles C. Di Peso. Amerind Foundation Publication No. 6. 1953. (out of print)
- The Upper Pima of San Cayetano del Tumacacori, by Charles C. Di Peso. Amerind Foundation Publication No. 7. 1956. (out of print)
- The Reeve Ruin of Southeastern Arizona, by Charles C. Di Peso. Amerind Foundation Publication No. 8. 1958. (out of print)
- Casas Grandes: A Fallen Trading Center of the Gran Chichimeca, by Charles C. Di Peso, John B. Rinaldo, and Gloria J. Fenner. Amerind Foundation Publication No. 9. Vols. 1–8. 1974. (out of print) ISBN 0873580567
- Exploring the Hohokam: Prehistoric Desert Peoples of the American Southwest, edited by George J. Gumerman. University of New Mexico Press. 1991. (out of print) ISBN 0826312284
- Culture and Contact: Charles C. Di Peso's Gran Chichimeca, edited by Anne I. Woosley and John C. Ravesloot. University of New Mexico Press. 1993. (out of print) ISBN 0826314600
- Mimbres Mogollon Archaeology, by Anne I. Woosley and Allan J. McIntyre. Amerind Foundation Publication No. 10. University of New Mexico Press. 1996. (out of print) ISBN 978-0826316745
- Great Towns and Regional Polities: Cultural Evolution in the U.S. Southwest and Southeast, edited by Jill E. Neitzel. University of New Mexico Press. 1999. (out of print) ISBN 0826320015
- Salado, edited by Jeffrey S. Dean. University of New Mexico Press. 2000. (out of print) ISBN 0826321690
- Anthropological Perspectives on Technology, edited by Michael B. Schiffer. University of New Mexico Press. 2001. ISBN 0826323693
- Embedded Symmetries: Natural and Cultural, edited by Dorothy K. Washburn. University of New Mexico Press. 2004. ISBN 0826331521
- Trincheras Sites in Time, Space, and Society, edited by Suzanne K. Fish, Paul R. Fish, and M. Elisa Villalpando. University of Arizona Press. 2007. ISBN 978-0816525409

== See also ==
- Category:Native American history of Arizona
