= Brunckow's Cabin =

Historic site in Cochise County, Arizona

- Interactive map of Brunckow's Cabin
- Location: Near Tombstone, Arizona, United States

History
- Built: 1858

Site notes
- Architectural style: Adobe cabin

Brunckow's Cabin is a historic cabin southwest of Tombstone in Cochise County, Arizona. It is purported to be the "bloodiest cabin in Arizona history;" between 1860 and 1890, at least twenty-one people were killed there, many of whom are buried on site. Presently, little of the cabin remains except for some foundations and small portions of the walls. A few unmarked graves have been identified, but because of theft, vandalism, and erosion, the site has been heavily damaged.

== History ==
=== Frederick Brunckow ===
Frederick Brunckow was born in Germany in 1830. After attending the University of Westphalia to become a mining engineer, Brunckow emigrated to the United States in 1850 and joined the Sonora Exploring and Mining Company, which eventually took him west.

In 1858, Brunckow left the Sonora Company to develop his own San Pedro Silver Mine, which was located approximately eight miles southwest of what would become Tombstone, near the San Pedro River. Joining him were a chemist named John Moss, or Morse, a German cook named David Brontrager, and two miners named James and William M. Williams. Relying mainly on Mexican labor, Brunckow built a store for supplies and a cabin to be used as a sleeping quarters. A small and simple structure, the cabin was made of adobe and had a tin roof and a fireplace.

On July 23, 1860, William Williams left the mine and went west to Fort Buchanan to purchase some flour. When he returned on the night of July 26, Williams found that the store had been ransacked; some of the provisions were missing and the rest had been knocked off of their shelves onto the floor. Continuing on, Williams found the source of a smell that he could not immediately identify when he arrived back at camp. His cousin, James, had been murdered and was lying among the provisions. Without hesitation, Williams ran out the door and went back to the fort to tell the soldiers.

When the soldiers arrived on the following morning, they found two more bodies. Morse was lying dead in the dirt outside of camp; he had been "ravaged by animals." Brunckow was found either near the entrance of the mine shaft or inside of it; he was reportedly killed with a rock drill. Brontrager and the Mexican laborers were missing, as well as the company's livestock. Altogether, about $3,000 worth of goods had been taken. Later that same night, Brontrager arrived at Camp Jecker and told the miners there that he had been taken hostage by the Mexican laborers. Brontrager said that the Mexicans had turned on him and his friends just a few hours after William Williams left for the fort and that they let him go at the international border because they believed him to be a good Catholic.

The soldiers buried Brunckow and the others at the cabin and the killers were never apprehended.

=== Milton B. Duffield ===
Milton B. Duffield is probably best known for being the first United States Marshal appointed to Arizona Territory, a post he held from March 6, 1863 to November 25, 1865. A man "of iron nerve, of ruffiantly instinct, and unimpeached aim," Duffield was not well-liked, but he did have a reputation for fearlessness. John Gregory Bourke once described him as wearing "11 firearms and a knife at one time, usually concealed."

In 1873, Duffield acquired ownership of Brunckow's Cabin and the mining claim, however, a man named James T. Holmes also claimed to be the owner. On June 5, 1874, Duffield arrived at Brunckow's Cabin to evict Holmes. As he approached, Duffield began "waving his arms and shouting like a mad-man" in his usual manner. Assuming that Duffield was "armed to the teeth," as he usually was, and knowing of his violent reputation, Holmes grabbed his double-barrelled shotgun, walked out the front door, and without hesitation shot the old lawman dead. It was at this point Holmes realized that his victim was unarmed.

Duffield was buried at the cabin. Holmes was arrested, tried for murder, and sentenced to three years in prison, but he escaped before having a chance to serve any of his time. The authorities did not make an effort in finding him and he was never seen in Arizona again.

=== Ed Schieffelin ===
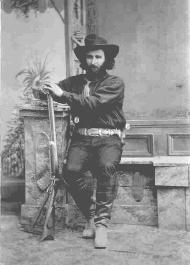
Ed Schieffelin in 1880.

Ed Schieffelin was a prospector known to history as the "father of Tombstone." In 1877, just prior to the discovery that led to the founding of Tombstone, Schieffelin established a "permanent camp" at Brunckow's Cabin to be used as a base for exploring. With his brother, Al, and a fellow prospector named Richard Gird, Schieffelin searched the area for weeks, constantly on the lookout for hostile Apaches, but his stay was uneventful. There were, however, "several fresh graves" at Brunckow's Cabin that served as "mute testimony to recent Apache raids."

Schieffelin is said to have used the cabin's fireplace for assaying silver ore samples. Furthermore, the location of the San Pedro Silver Mine persuaded him to search the rocky outcroppings to the northeast.

=== Frank Stilwell ===
Frank Stilwell, a member of the outlaw Cochise County Cowboys and of the Clanton faction during the famed Earp-Clanton feud, owned the land and the cabin for a while. On March 20, 1882, Wyatt Earp found him lying on a flatcar in the Tucson train station, apparently intent on killing Virgil Earp. Earp killed him.

=== Newspaper accounts ===
By the 1880s, Arizona newspapers were already reporting on the "ghostly apparitions" said to be haunting the cabin or the many different murders that had taken place. In 1881, Prescott's Arizona Democrat discussed the cabin's history of "uninterrupted.... violence and murder," affirming that between the time of Frederick Brunckow's death and the writing of the newspaper, an additional seventeen men had met their end at the cabin. The newspaper also attested to the site's haunted reputation: "The graves lie thick around the old adobe house.... Prospectors and miners avoid the spot as they would the plague, and many of them will tell you that the unquiet spirits of the departed are wont to revisit.... and wander about the scene."

A May 20, 1897, issue of the Tombstone Prospector said that on one occasion a gang of bandits fought each other for the loot they had recently stolen from a Wells Fargo bullion wagon. Apparently, they could not decide on how to divide their spoils so they turned against one another and were shot to death. All five of the bandits were later found dead and the load of bullion was recovered at the scene.

The Tombstone Prospector also mentions a ghost that walks around the cabin at night, but when somebody tries to approach it vanishes and reappears somewhere else. The newspaper continues on by saying that some people had reported hearing the sounds of mining coming from the shaft, such as "pounding on drills, pickaxes pulling away rocks, and the sawing of lumber for trusses."

== See also ==
- Cerro Colorado, Arizona
