= Little Dragoon Mountains =

Landform in Chochise County, Arizona

Coordinates: 32°06′00″N 110°07′20″W

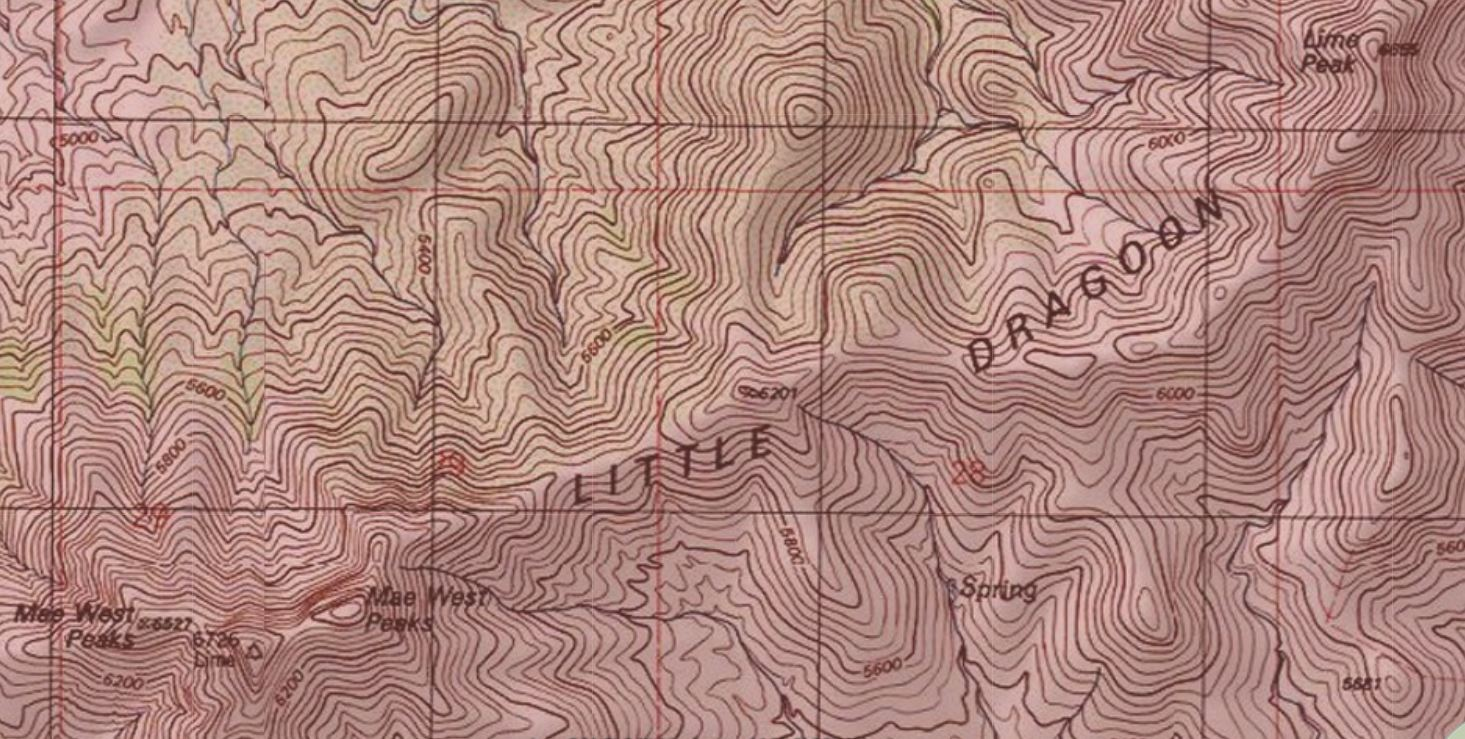
USGS topographic map of a portion of the ridgeline of the Little Dragoons

The Little Dragoon Mountains, are included in the Douglas Ranger District of Coronado National Forest, in Cochise County, Arizona.

The summit of the range is the center peak of the three Mae West Peaks, 6 miles northwest of Dragoon, Arizona. The center peak, known as Lime has a peak elevation of 6,732 feet (2,052 m). Lime Peak is a named peak along the ridgeline approximately 2.5 miles to the northeast which has a peak elevation of 6,658 feet (2,029 m).

Interstate 10 passes through the Texas Canyon area approximately three miles to the southeast of the Little Dragoon ridgeline.

== See also ==
- Dragoon Mountains
