= Lime Mountain (Maricopa County, Arizona) =

Landform in Maricopa County, Arizona

- Location within Arizona

Highest point
- Elevation: 3,999 ft (1,219 m) NGVD 29
- Coordinates: 33°32′13″N 111°10′50″W

Geography
- Location: Maricopa County, Arizona, U.S.
- Topo map: USGS Pinyon Mountain

Lime Mountain is a promontory on the eastern slopes of Castle Dome, a 5,308-foot (1,618 m) mountain, east of Scottsdale in the Superstition Wilderness and the Tonto National Forest.
