= Tough Nut Mine =

Silver mine in Cochise County, Arizona

Coordinates: 31.70°N 110.06°W

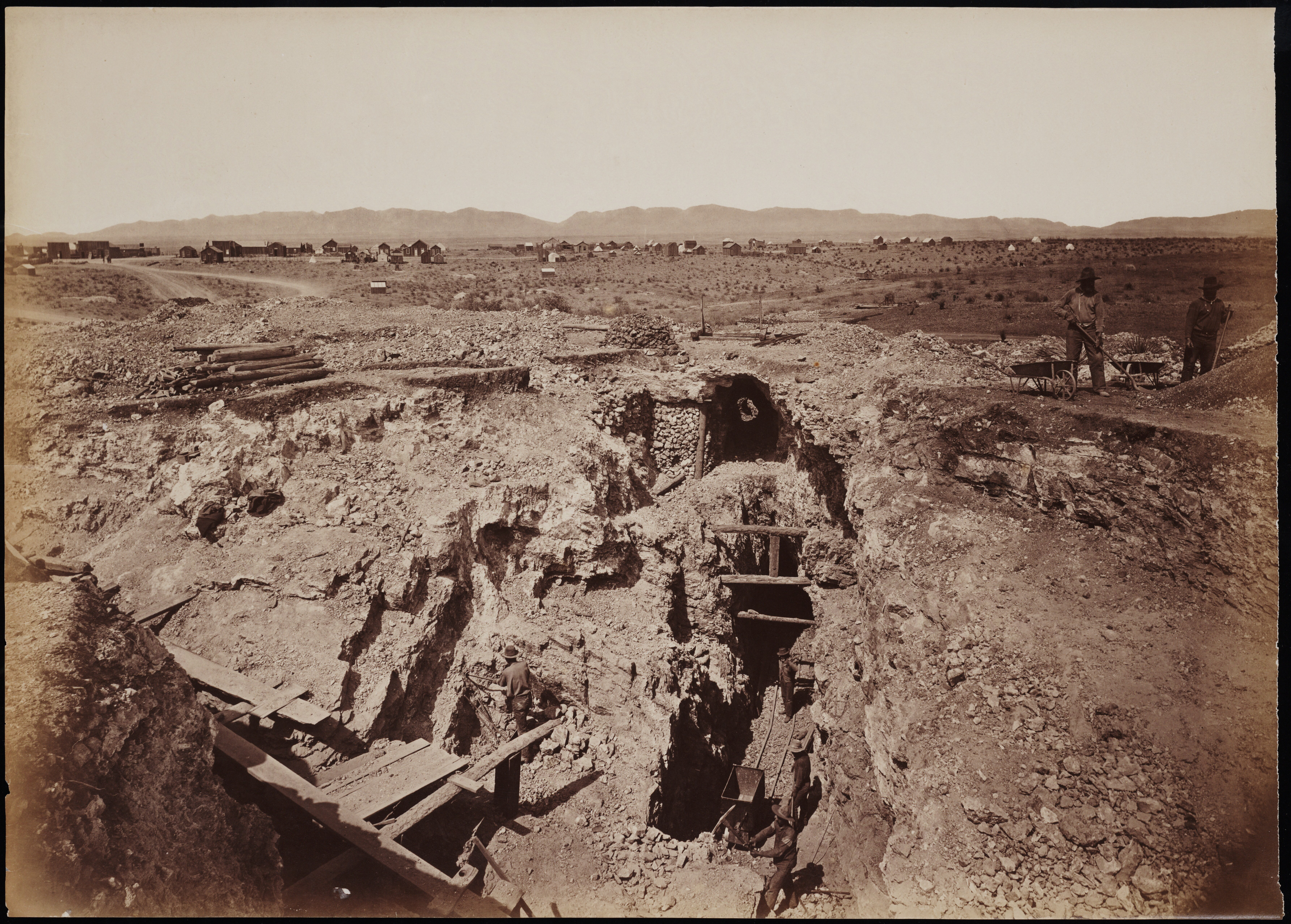
The "Old South Shaft Ore Quarry, Face of Tough-nut Mine, part of Town of Tombstone, Arizona. Dragoon Mountains, with Cochise Stronghold in background," mammoth plate, by the American photographer Carleton E. Watkins, 1880

The Tough Nut Mine is a silver mine established just prior to and just outside Tombstone in Cochise County, Arizona. After an early period of operation that began in the late 19th century, the mine was closed and then reopened in the 1970s.

== Original mine ==
The mine came to be one of two big strikes by the Tombstone Gold and Silver Mining Company. On March 5, 1879, U.S. Deputy Mineral Surveyor Solon M. Allis finished laying out a new town site on a mesa named Goose Flats at 4,539 feet (1,383 m), just above the Tough Nut mine. The area was large enough to hold a growing town and was named "Tombstone" after Ed Schieffelin's initial mining claim. The shelters at Watervale were relocated to the new town site and a scattering of cabins and tents were quickly built for about 100 residents.In 1880, Al and Ed Schieffelin sold their two-thirds interest in the Tough Nut for $1 million (~$27.8 million in 2024) each to capitalists from Philadelphia, and sometime later Gird sold his one-third interest for the same amount. Al Schieffelin used a portion of his wealth to build Schieffelin Hall.

It was rich in silver and lead. Secondary commodities were copper, gold, and zinc. Small amounts of cadmium were also produced.

== Present mine ==
Operations resumed in the 1970s, but from a different entrance. Modern production is primarily silver, copper, lead, and zinc, with smaller amounts of gold and vanadium. The minerals are found in limestone and diorite dating from the late cretaceous period.
