= Tuf Nut Historic Commercial District =

Historic district in Arkansas, United States

- U.S. National Register of Historic Places
- U.S. Historic district
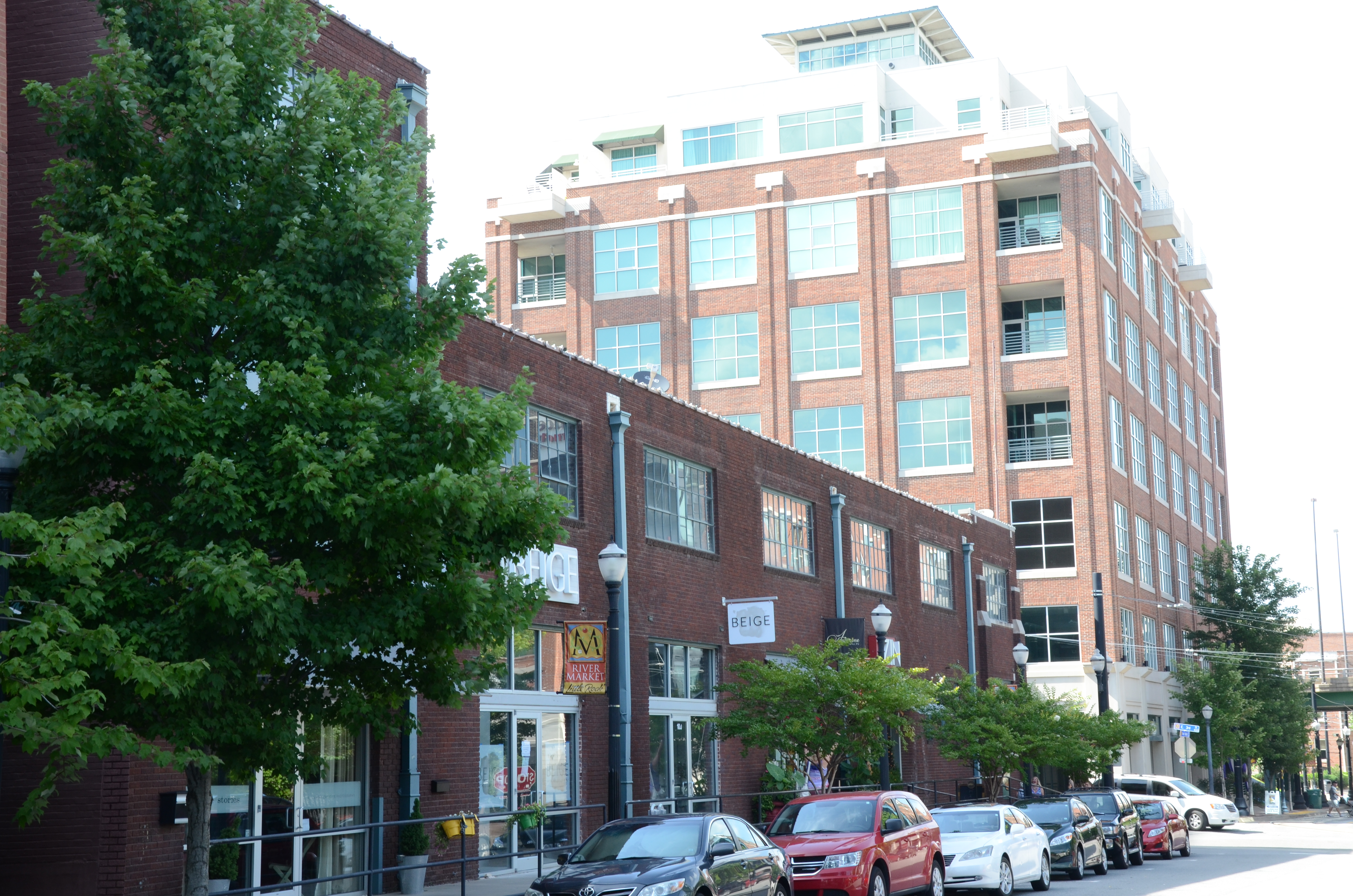

- Location within Arkansas Location within the United States
- Location: 300-312 S. Rock St. and 423 E. 3rd St., Little Rock, Arkansas
- Coordinates: 34°44′42″N 92°15′58″W
- Area: less than one acre
- Built: 1922
- Architectural style: Early Commercial
- NRHP reference No.: 99000856
- Added to NRHP: March 27, 2003

The Tuf Nut Historic Commercial District encompasses two commercial/industrial buildings at 300–312 South Rock Street and 423 East 3rd Street in Little Rock, Arkansas. These brick buildings were built in 1922 and 1927 for the Tuf Nut Garment Manufacturing Company, and are representative of the industrial development of eastern downtown Little Rock during the period between 1922 and 1950. Both buildings are essentially vernacular, representing a trend of that period toward utilitarian forms for industrial architecture.

The district was listed on the National Register of Historic Places in 2003.

== See also ==
- National Register of Historic Places listings in Little Rock, Arkansas
