= Lime Mountain (Elko County, Nevada) =

Mountain in Elko County, Nevada, United States

Coordinates: 41°34′00″N 116°11′36″W

Lime Mountain is a summit in the U.S. state of Nevada. The elevation is 6,936 feet (2,114 m).

Lime Mountain was named for deposits of lime in the area.
