= Texas Canyon =

Valley in Cochise County, Arizona

Coordinates: 32.015°N 110.112°W

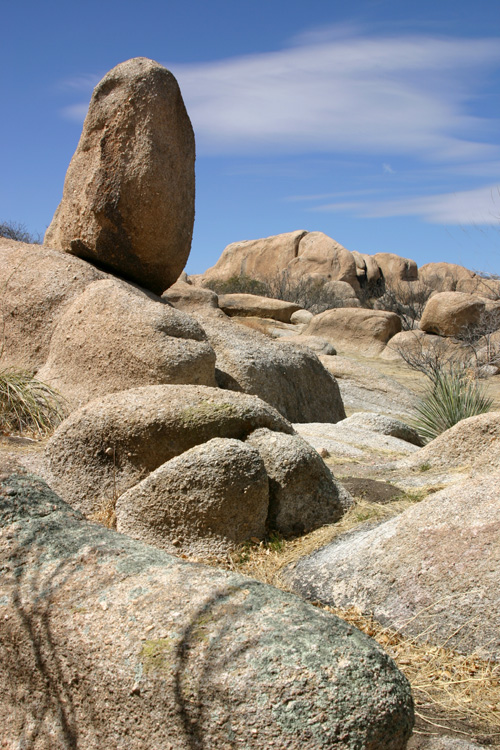
Rock formations in Texas Canyon

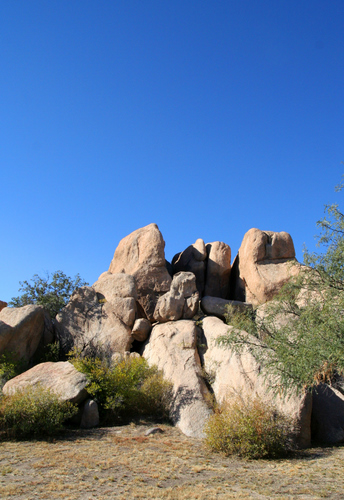
Texas Canyon in 2006

Texas Canyon is a valley in Cochise County, Arizona, about 20 miles east of Benson on Interstate 10. Lying between the Little Dragoon Mountains to the north and the Dragoon Mountains to the south and known for its giant granite boulders, the canyon attracts rockhounds and photographers.

== History ==
The stagecoach route of the Butterfield Overland Mail passed through Texas Canyon from 1858 until the outbreak of the Civil War in 1862, when the stage line suspended operations. The canyon is historically within the range of the Chiricahua Apache, and Cochise made his last stronghold near here in the Dragoon Mountains during the mid-1870s.

In the mid to late 1880s, David A. Adams, a Cochise County pioneer, moved to the area from Coleman County, Texas, soon to be followed by other family members. Descendants still live and raise cattle on the old family ranch.

The Amerind Foundation, a privately funded archaeological and ethnographic research facility, library, museum and art gallery founded by William Shirley Fulton in the 1930s, is located in Texas Canyon a short distance from exit 318 of Interstate 10.
