= Dragoon Mountains =

Landform in Cochise County, Arizona

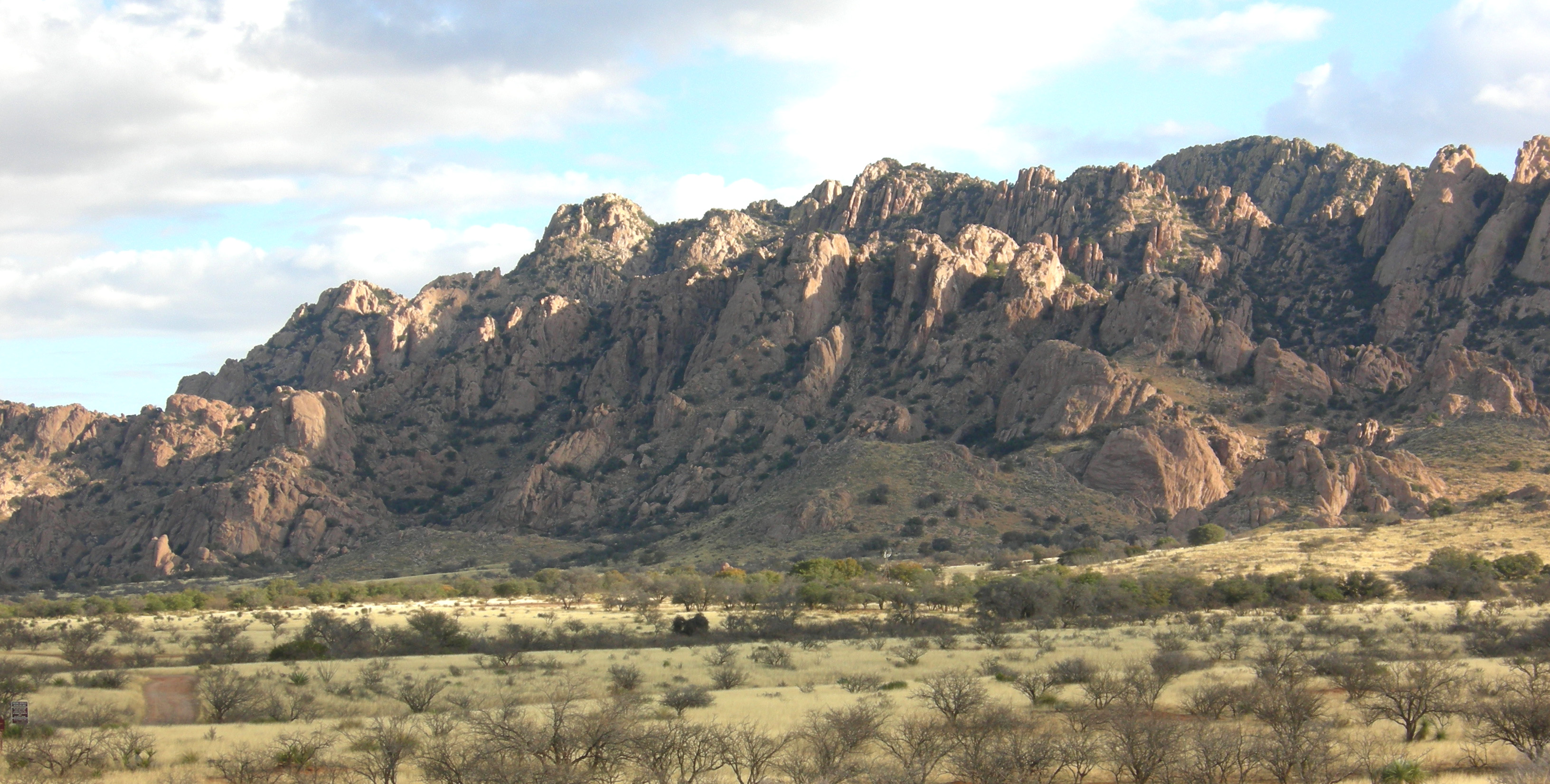
- Dragoon Mountains viewed from the south.

Highest point
- Peak: Mount Glenn
- Elevation: 7,532 ft (2,296 m)
- Coordinates: 31°53′N 109°59′W

Dimensions
- Length: 43 mi (69 km) north to south
- Width: 35 mi (56 km) east to west Extent includes low land hills and valleys
- Area: 921 mi^{2} (2,390 km^{2})

Geography
- Location within Arizona
- Country: United States
- State: Arizona
- Region: Madrean Sky Islands
- District: Cochise County
- Borders on: Little Dragoon Mountains-NW; Sulphur Springs Valley-NE; San Pedro Valley (Arizona)-W & SW

The Dragoon Mountains is a range of mountains located in Cochise County, Arizona. The range is about 25 mi (40 km) long, running on an axis extending south-south east through Willcox. The name originates from the 3rd U.S. Cavalry Dragoons who battled the Chiricahua, including Cochise, during the Apache Wars. The Dragoons established posts around 1856 after the Gadsden Purchase made it a U.S. territory.

== History ==
Fossilized horn coral has been discovered on exposed limestone rock.

Ancient pictographs and matate dating to AD 1200 exist in the area and are attributed to the Mogollon people. The Apache people resided in this area beginning in the 15th century.

The warrior Cochise and his army defeated a small force of Confederate soldiers here at the First Battle of Dragoon Springs but was defeated at the Second Battle of Dragoon Springs a few days later. Cochise Stronghold Memorial Park lies near Mount Glenn on the eastern slope of the range and the historic town of Tombstone can be found at the southwestern portion of the range. There are also several ghost towns in the Dragoon Mountains including Gleeson and Courtland.

== Geography ==
The range is south of Interstate 10, between the Whetstone Mountains to the west, and Chiricahua Mountains to the east. Higher elevations of the major ranges in the region are in the Madrean Sky Islands ecoregion, with sky island habitats.

Mount Glenn (7,520 ft; 2,290 m) is the highest point in the range. The Little Dragoon Mountains are the continuation of the Dragoon Mountains north of Texas Canyon.

The mountains were included in the short-lived Dragoon National Forest, which was established in 1907 and combined into Coronado National Forest in 1908. The area is now included in the Douglas Ranger District.

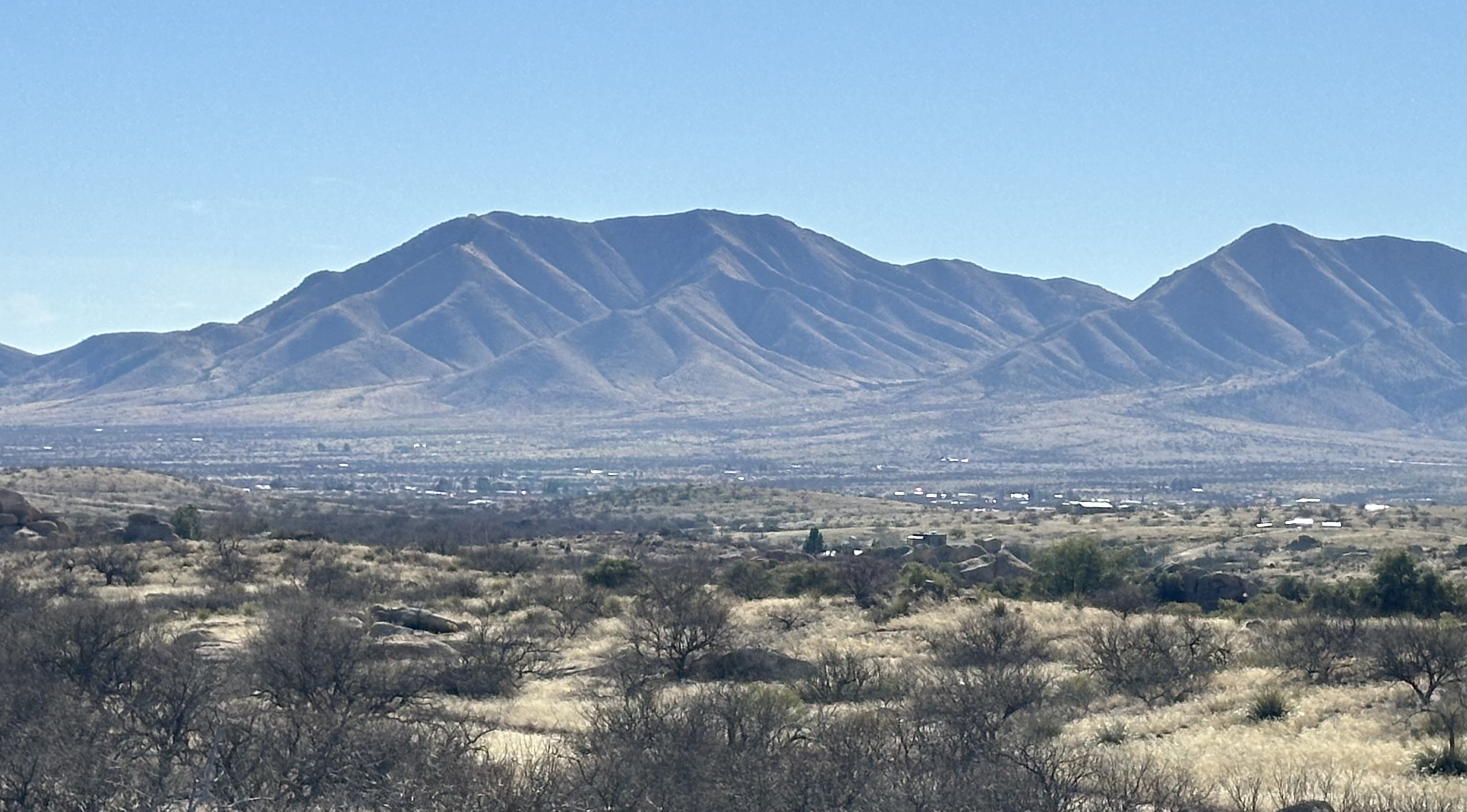
Dragoon, Arizona lies between the Dragoon Mountains to the southwest and the Little Dragoon Mountains to the northwest.

== Flora and fauna ==
Evergreen oak woodlands and pines surround many areas of the range, as well as desert ferns, yucca, and cactus. Other notable species in the area include hexalectris colemanii, lupinus lemmonii, and penstemon discolor.
