= Battle of Mount Gray =

Part of the Apache Wars in New Mexico (1864)

Coordinates: 35°44′45″N 111°28′25″W

- Part of the Apache Wars, American Civil War
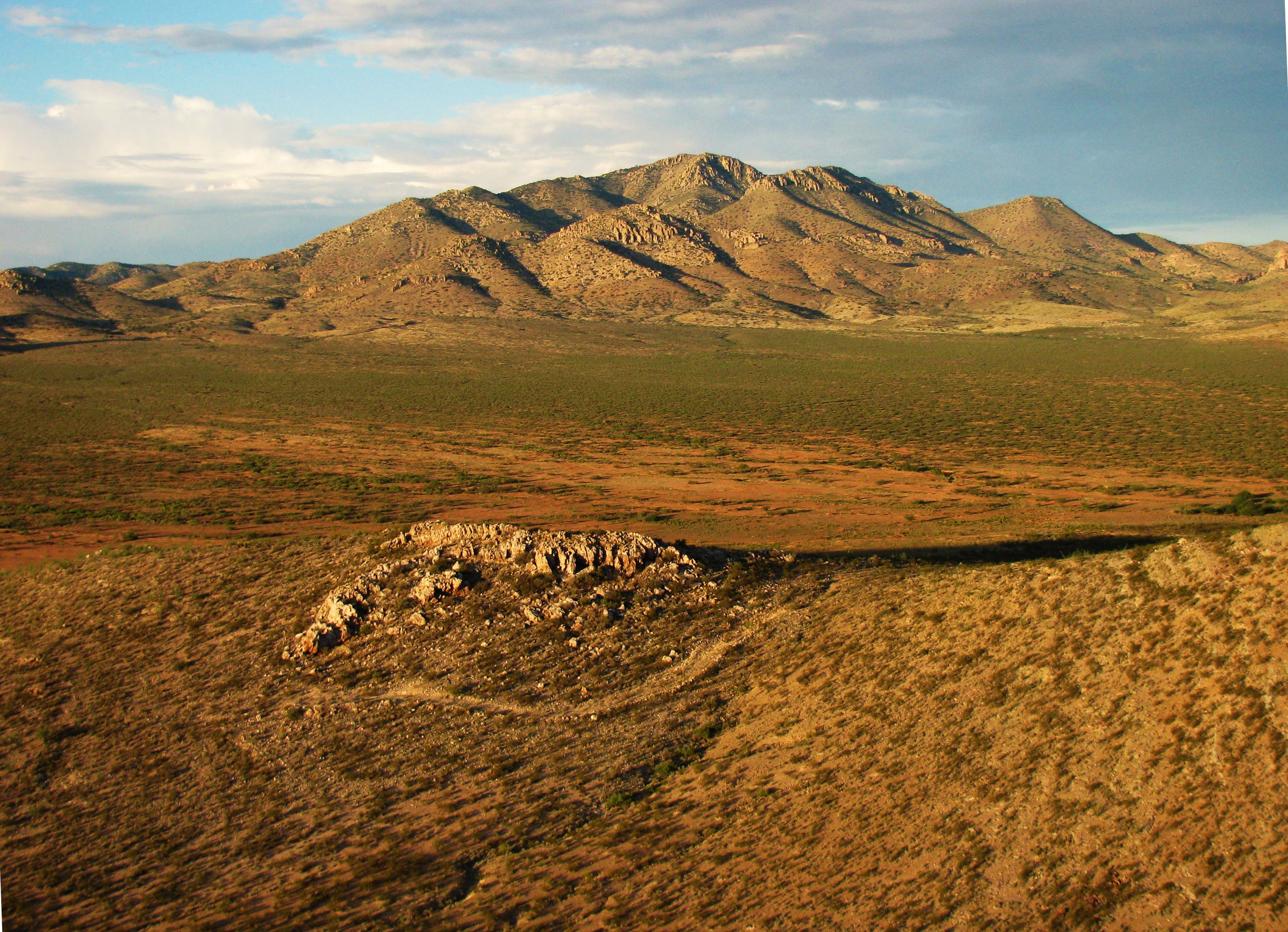
- Mount Gray looking west from the Animas Valley.
Date	April 7, 1864
Location	Mount Gray, Sierra Bonita Mountains, Confederate Arizona; now in Hidalgo County, New Mexico
Result	U.S. victory; U.S. Forces successfully defended Gray Mountain from Apache attacks

Belligerents
United States	Apache

Commanders and leaders
(United States) James H. Whitlock	Unknown

Strength
59	~250

Casualties and losses
None	21 killed

The Battle of Mount Gray was an engagement of the Apache Wars fought at the foothills of Gray Mountain (then known as Mount Gray) on April 7, 1864. A troop of the United States Army's California Column attacked a superior force of Chiricahua Apaches at their camp and routed them from the field.

== Background ==
When the American Civil War began in 1861, Confederate Arizona was established so the Union raised a volunteer force of Californians to march through Arizona to capture the territory and to reinforce the Union army in the New Mexico Territory. During the 900-mile journey in 1862 and 1863, the California Column constructed or occupied several camps and forts, and when the column moved on, men were left behind to garrison them. One of these posts was Camp Mimbres.

On March 15, 1864, Apaches raided a herd of livestock at Cow Springs. By March 27, the garrison of Camp Mimbres was informed of the attack so Captain James H. Whitlock organized an expedition to retrieve the stolen livestock. The expedition was made up of 46 men from the 5th California Infantry along with 10 men from the 1st California Cavalry. A few militia scouts also went along to be used as trackers. They headed towards Stein's Peak in the Sierra Bonita Mountains, and when they arrived, an Apache trail was spotted which led north into the San Simon Valley. After a few more days of marching, the Apache trail turned west, and it was followed to the base of Mount Gray within present day Hidalgo County, New Mexico.

== Battle ==
At about 4:00 am on April 7, while marching through the foothills, Captain Whitlock noticed campfires in the distance, and he immediately assumed it to be an Apache camp. Quickly Whitlock advanced his troop to the camp where around 250 Apaches warriors were resting with the herd of livestock. Whitlock decided to separate his command into a few groups to surround the camp, they would then attack at first light.

When the sun rose above the horizon, the American soldiers began their assault. Whitlock led the charge into the Apache camp, which was defended by the Chiricahua for over an hour before they retreated up the mountain.

When the Americans were finally in control, they set fire to the wickiups and destroyed about 300 pounds of dried mescal, an Apache food source. While burning the mescal, 30 of the retreating Apaches turned around and attacked the soldiers to try to stop the destruction of their food, but they were driven off by effective volleys of rifle fire. Twenty-one Apaches were killed and left on the field; others were wounded but escaped. Forty-five horses and mules were captured. There were no American casualties.

== Aftermath ==
The battle at Mount Gray was one of the more significant engagements fought between the California Column and the Apache. Similar to the earlier Battle of Apache Pass, the Californians were outnumbered but managed to defeat a larger force of hardened warriors.

Whitlock Valley and the Whitlock Mountains were later named after Captain Whitlock.

== See also ==
- Skirmish in Doubtful Canyon
