= West Doubtful Canyon =

Landform in Cochise County, Arizona

- Location within Arizona

Geography
- Location: Cochise County, Arizona, United States
- Coordinates: 32°17′19″N 109°06′24″W
- Interactive map of West Doubtful Canyon

West Doubtful Canyon was the name of one of two canyons in the Peloncillo Mountains, once considered in the 19th century as one canyon "Doubtful Canyon" that served as the pass through those mountains. Today the canyon bearing the name Doubtful Canyon, is mostly in Cochise County, Arizona, United States, near the New Mexico border. It descends to the east into the Animas Valley past Steins Peak it is in Hidalgo County, New Mexico. The western canyon is now called West Doubtful Canyon and it descends into the San Simon Valley, in Cochise County, Arizona.

== History ==
The mountain water sources and the low north south divide that lay between the two Doubtful canyons made it a favored shortcut to the Southern Emigrant Trail wagon road for east west travelers. Doubtful Canyon and West Doubtful Canyon formed the pass where the Butterfield Overland Mail passed through the Peloncillo Mountains. However it earned its name for it was a favored site for ambushes by the Apache during the Apache Wars.
