= Whitlock Valley =

Landform in Graham County, Arizona

- Location within Arizona
- Length: 22 mi (35 km)
- Width: 9 mi (14 km)

Geography
- Location: Graham County, Arizona, United States
- Population centers: Duncan, AZ, Safford, AZ
- Borders on: Whitlock Mountains-W; Black Hills (Greenlee County)-N; Peloncillo Mountains-E; San Simon Valley-SW & S
- Coordinates: 32°33′10″N 109°20′7″W
- Interactive map of Whitlock Valley

The Whitlock Valley is a small valley in southeast Graham County, Arizona, southwestern United States, lying between three mountain ranges. The valley lies on the south perimeter region of the White Mountains in eastern Arizona, and lies south of the west-flowing Gila River, and the region transitions south into Cochise County and three large valleys, with some scattered dry lakes. The valley is endorheic, with a small dry lake called Parks Lake, and merges southwest into the north of the San Simon Valley, where the San Simon River has its origins in the flatlands, and surrounding perimeter mountains. The valley was named after Captain James H. Whitlock who commanded during the Battle of Mount Gray in 1864 which was fought near the valley.

== Description ==
=== Regional endorheic valley ===
The west-flowing Gila River is forced into a NW-West-SW excursion by the small range of the Black Hills (Greenlee County). The Whitlock Valley drains south from the range, and merges into the north of the San Simon Valley, where the San Simon River forms a playa, flatland region, then continues northwest to the Gila River. A water divide creates Parks Lake at the south of the Whitlock Valley.

=== Whitlock Valley ===
Whitlock Valley is a mostly north–south 22-mile (35 km) long valley, bordered on the west by the small north–south Whitlock Mountains. The east of the valley is bordered by the north region of the Peloncillo Mountains (Cochise County), a north–south stretch, only about 8 mi wide. The north Peloncillos form the border between Graham County, northwest, and Greenlee County to the east, (extreme southeast county).

=== Parks Lake and Whitlock Cienega ===
Parks Lake is the low point of Whitlock Valley in the south. The southern Whitlock Mountains are to the west, and on the southeast foothills of the Whitlocks lie Whitlock Cienega, at 32°33′10″N 109°20′7″W.

In the Parks Lake region, can be found a sedge, Scirpus pungens, (Schoenoplectus pungens), as well as other lakebed, and marsh plants. Parks Lake is located at 32.5678°N 109.3031°W.

== Madrean Sky Islands region ==
The valley lies in a region of southeast Arizona and southwest New Mexico called the Madrean Sky Islands; the valley is a northeast drainage to the San Simon Valley, but only in the Whitlock Valley southern region, and the neighboring mountains east and west. The south of the valley forms a water divide to the northeast region of San Simon Creek.

== See also ==
- List of valleys of Arizona
- Peloncillo Mountains (Cochise County)
- San Simon Valley
