= Cienega of San Simon =

Wetlands of the San Simon River, Cochise County, Arizona

Cienega of San Simon, was a cienega, an area of springs 13 miles up the San Simon River from San Simon Station, in Cochise County, Arizona.

== History ==
Cienega of San Simon was a camping and watering place on the Southern Emigrant Trail after John Coffee Hays pioneered the Tucson Cutoff route from Cooke's Wagon Road to the east in the Animas Valley to Tucson via Stein's Pass to the Cienega, to Apache Pass, to Nugent’s Pass, to the lower crossing of the San Pedro River near Tres Alamos, to rejoin Cooke's road again at a waterhole, just east of modern Mescal, Arizona. The Cienega was located 5 miles south southwest of the mouth of Stein's Pass and 23 miles from Apache Pass. It was used by the San Antonio-San Diego Mail Line as a rest and water stop and by later stagecoach lines during the Apache Wars as a safer route than the Butterfield Overland Mail route through the Doubtful Canyon to the north.

Today the New Mexico San Simon Cienaga does not extend as far north and is found further up the river in Hidalgo County, New Mexico at 32°03′03″N 109°2′15″W.
