= Steins, New Mexico =

Steins
- Ghost town
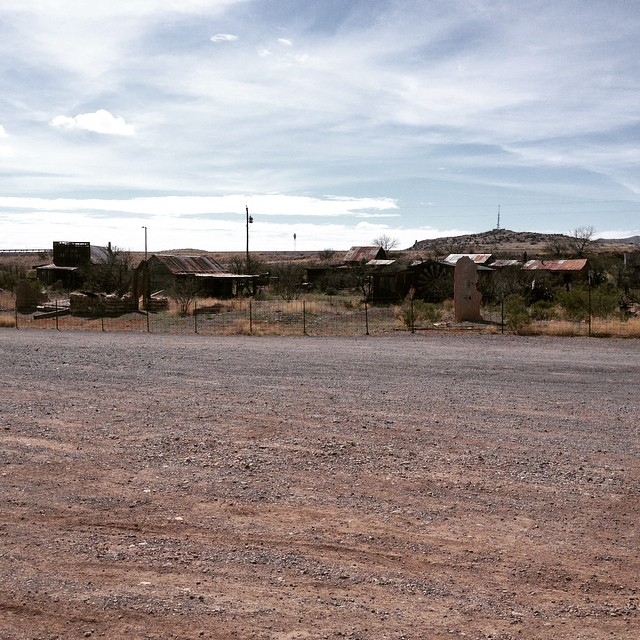
- Steins, New Mexico (2015).

- Location within New Mexico
- Coordinates: 32°13′45″N 108°59′22″W
- Country: United States
- State: New Mexico
- County: Hidalgo
- Established: 1880

Steins is a ghost town in Stein's Pass of Hidalgo County, New Mexico. It was originally called Stein's Pass after the nearby pass through the Peloncillo Mountains (Hidalgo County). The pass was named after United States Army Major Enoch Steen, who camped nearby in 1856, as he explored the recently acquired Gadsden Purchase.

== History ==
The town can trace its origin to a small stop on the Birch Stage Line that was established in 1857. Properly founded in 1880, the town was named after United States Army Major Enoch Steen (whose name was sometimes spelled as "Steins"). The town began to prosper when mineral deposits like gold, silver, and copper were discovered in the nearby Peloncillo Mountains. Further success was brought when the Southern Pacific Railroad established a rail line in 1878, and a local quarry was opened up.> Steins had no natural source of water, so all water had to be brought in by train. In 1905 a rock-crushing plant was built to produce track ballast for the railroad.

In 1944, toward the end of World War II, the railway ceased operations at the Steins quarry and gave notice it would no longer subsidize water deliveries. The railway offered the inhabitants of Steins free transport elsewhere with what they could carry; most of the population accepted this offer, leaving their houses and many of their possessions behind. The post office in the town closed at that time, and eventually Steins was completely abandoned; a later fire destroyed a good majority of what was left behind. In 1988, Larry and Linda Link purchased the locale and began offering ghost town tours. In 2011, however, Larry Link was murdered and tours ceased.

It is unusual in the old West ghost towns in having been a railroad rather than a mining town. Steins Pass has been mistaken by some people for the pass at Doubtful Canyon near Steins Peak, a location to the northwest in the same mountain range, which was the location of a Butterfield Overland Mail station and the site of the Battle of Doubtful Canyon.
