= Peloncillo Mountains =

Peloncillo Mountains may refer to:

- Peloncillo Mountains (Hidalgo County), New Mexico
- Peloncillo Mountains (Cochise County), Arizona
