= Steins Creek =

Waterway in New Mexico and Arizona

Steins Creek, a stream or arroyo tributary to the San Simon River, that arises within an east–west running canyon, in Hidalgo County, New Mexico with its mouth in Cochise County, Arizona. This canyon provides the gap, called Stein's Pass, through which the railroad and Interstate 10 pass through the Peloncillo Mountains. Steins Creek has its source at 32°14′10″N 108°59′43″W, and its mouth in the San Simon Valley, where its waters usually sink into the soil, short of any confluence with the San Simon River.

== See also ==
- List of rivers of Arizona
- List of rivers of New Mexico
