= Black Hills (Greenlee County) =

Landform in Greenlee County, Arizona

- Location within Arizona

Highest point
- Peak: Guthrie Peak
- Elevation: 6,571 ft (2,003 m)
- Coordinates: 32°53′13″N 109°18′54″W

Dimensions
- Length: 20 mi (32 km) E-W
- Width: 15 mi (24 km) (N-S)-(massif)

Geography
- Country: United States
- State: Arizona
- Regions: Arizona transition zone, Sonoran Desert and Whitlock Valley
- Counties: Greenlee and Graham
- River: Gila River
- Settlements: Guthrie, Three Way, Safford and Duncan

The Black Hills of Greenlee County are a 20 mi (32 km) long mountain range of the extreme northeast Sonoran Desert bordering the south of the White Mountains of eastern Arizona's transition zone.

The mountain range is bordered by the Gila River, and the range is a large block that forces the Gila to flow northwest, west, southwest; at the west, the Gila River begins an excursion northwest at the start of the Gila Valley, where Safford and Thatcher lie in the valley.

The southwest quarter of the mountain range lies in the southeast of Graham County.

== Description ==
The Black Hills are on the southern border of the Arizona transition zone, with the complete excursion of the Gila River and mountain range in the zone, and valleys to the south, in the Sonoran Desert.

The center south of the range starts the northern drainage into the small Whitlock Valley. The southeast of the Black Hills start the small hills at the north of a north–south stretch of the Peloncillo Mountains. The southwest of the range start the small hills associated with the northeast of the north–south small range of the Whitlock Mountains.

=== Peaks, and landforms ===
The highest elevation in the mountains is Guthrie Peak at 6,571 feet (2,003 m), located at 32.88701°N 109.31507°W in the range's center-east, along with Guthrie Mountain, 4,495 feet (1,370 m) further northeast, bordering the Gila River.

== See also ==
- Arizona transition zone
