= List of killings by law enforcement officers in the United States, January 2014 =

This is a list of people reported killed by non-military law enforcement officers in the United States in January 2014, whether in the line of duty or not, and regardless of reason or method. The listing documents the occurrence of a death, making no implications regarding wrongdoing or justification on the part of the person killed or officer involved. Killings are arranged by date of the incident that caused death. Different death dates, if known, are noted in the description. The table below lists 80 people.

== January 2014 ==
Date	Name (Age) of Deceased	Race	State (City)	Description
2014-01-31	Alton Reaves (31)	Black	Kingstree, South Carolina	
2014-01-31	Michael Paul Napier (33)	Hispanic	Vista, California	San Diego County Sheriff's Deputies shot and killed Napier because he reached for his waist band when they ordered him to show his hands. Four deputies were serving a felony warrant for drug-related charges when they contacted the victim, who was in his garage fixing his bicycle. It is believed that two deputies fired shots.
2014-01-31	Zachary Andrews (28)	White	Laughlin, Nevada	Officers Samuel Soloriao Solorio of the Las Vegas Metropolitan Police Department's Laughlin substation shot robbery suspect Zachary Ryan Andrews. Andrews "allegedly produced a firearm" and the officers "engaged the individual in gunfire."
2014-01-30	Jose Angel Garcia Jauregui (27)	Hispanic	Santaquin, Utah	Garcia-Jauregui shot and killed Sgt. Cory Wride when the officer stopped to check on a vehicle he thought was abandoned. Officers caught up with Garcia-Jauregui and exchanged gunfire with him. Garcia-Jauregui and another officer were both shot and hospitalized; Garcia-Jauregui died later of his injuries.
2014-01-30	Mark Anthony Ayala (36)	Hispanic	El Centro, California	
2014-01-30	Steven Burke Pettersen (47)	White	Santa Clarita, California	
2014-01-29	Christopher Stirkens (25)	Black	Gaithersburg, Maryland	
2014-01-29	Curley Edward Spry (42)	White	Logan County, West Virginia	Allegedly pulled a hand gun on a trooper.
2014-01-29	Cornelius Turner (19)	Black	Milwaukee, Wisconsin	Shot by police after allegedly robbing a beer delivery driver.
2014-01-29	Lawrence D. Chavez (29)	Hispanic	DeRidder, Louisiana	
2014-01-28	Grace Louise Denk (21)	White	Wilmington, North Carolina	She was shot and killed during a confrontation with Wilmington Police Department officers, after her ex-boyfriend called 911 saying she was suicidal.
2014-01-28	Michael Gabriele (46)	White	Passaic, New Jersey	
2014-01-28	Felix Navarette (29)	Hispanic	Sioux City, Iowa	
2014-01-28	Cameron Lupton (28)	White	DeKalb, Illinois	
2014-01-27	Julius Cecil Freeman (45)	White	Chesterfield, South Carolina	
2014-01-27	Luis Morin (39)	Hispanic	Coachella, California	
2014-01-27	Charles Hull (56)	Black	Penn Hills, Pennsylvania	
2014-01-26	Aaron DeVenere (27)	White	Escondido, California	
2014-01-26	Pierree Davis (21)	Black	Federal Heights, Colorado	
2014-01-25	Zachary J. Sumner (35)	White	Del City, Oklahoma	
2014-01-25	Praminder Singh Shergill (43)	Asian	Lodi, California	Lodi police officers Cpl. Scott Bratton and Officer Adam Lockie shot and killed Shergill as he charged them with a knife. Shergill was a Gulf War veteran. During his numerous contacts with mental health professionals, he had been diagnosed, to one degree or another, with Schizoaffective disorder (bipolar type) with sometimes paranoia and earlier on, methamphetamine abuse. While there was an eye to determine if his military service may have contributed to his mental health issues, he was never diagnosed with Post-Traumatic Stress Disorder (PTSD). posttraumatic stress disorder. Prosecutors ruled the shooting death justified in December.
2014-01-24	Kevin Shane McCoshum (29)	White	Yuba City, California	
2014-01-24	Clint Evans McKinney (53)	White	Gaffney, South Carolina	
2014-01-23	Chris Provost (24)	Black	Houston, Texas	
2014-01-22	Harold Powers (43)	White	Hawesville, KY	
2014-01-21	Joshua Seth Layne (35)	White	Dunlap, Tennessee	
2014-01-21	Tom Smith, Jr. (42)	White	San Francisco, California	Detective Sergeant Thomas Smith was accidentally killed by another officer while conducting a probation check. BART will pay Smith's family $3.1 million settlement.
2014-01-21	Jose Munguia (21)	Hispanic	Oakland, California	Munguia was shot and killed after fleeing from a stolen vehicle with a hand gun.
2014-01-21	Eldrin Loren Smart (31)	Black	Kenner, Louisiana	Smart was shot when a detective fired four shots inside a fleeing vehicle he was driving.
2014-01-21	Antonio Mestas (19)	Hispanic	Oakland, California	Mestas was driving a stolen SUV and was shot when he ran from the vehicle holding a gun.
2014-01-21	Keith Ronald Koster (54)	White	Indianapolis, Indiana	An unnamed officer shot Keith Koster, a mentally ill man, while in the process of a Welfare Check. Koster had picked up a gun in his apartment and began waving it at officers, after a failed takedown with non lethal beanbag rounds and hours of negotiations officers shot and killed Koster.
2014-01-20	Andrew Law (36)	White	Seattle, Washington	After multiple calls about a man waving a gun around officers found Andrew Law, they say he refused to give up the weapon and was shot and killed. The gun turned out to be fake.
2014-01-20	Diana Crockett Conner (61)	White	Interlachen, Florida	
2014-01-20	Earl Douglas Braddy	Unknown race	Loxley, Alabama	Officers were advised shots were fired before arriving to the home of Earl Braddy and his wife Emma. Officers entered residence and the couple were struggling over a pistol, Earl Braddy eventually pointed the weapon toward officers at which time both officers fired upon Earl Braddy.
2014-01-19	Rodney Golden (41)	White	Pittsburgh, Pennsylvania	Golden was shot and killed after slashing a woman's throat in an apartment complex.
2014-01-18	Caleb Jeffrey Surface (23)	White	Fairfield, Ohio	
2014-01-17	Blas Leroux (34)	White	Denver, Colorado	Leroux died 3 days after he was shot by police after he reportedly held a woman hostage in a Denver 7-Eleven.
2014-01-16	Gabriel Sanchez Velasquez (31)	Hispanic	Apache, Arizona	Shot and killed by border patrol.
2014-01-16	Henry Jackson (19)	Black	Ardmore, Oklahoma	After wounding 2 federal officers Jackson was shot and killed.
2014-01-16	Raymond Roberts (28)	Unknown race	Lake Elsinore, California	Killed after running an officers foot over.
2014-01-16	Jordan Baker (26)	Black	Houston, Texas	A Houston Police officer was working an off-duty, extra employment job at a strip center located at 5700 W. Little York Road. The strip center had experienced multiple robberies and began to hire off-duty officers to provide extra security. While the officer was working at the location he attempted to stop and question Baker, who he thought was acting suspicious. When the officer approached Baker a brief struggle and foot chase ensued. At some point Baker stopped fleeing, reached into his waistband and began to charge at the officer. The officer discharged his weapon, fatally striking Barker. Further investigation determined Barker was unarmed.
2014-01-16	Marie King (55)	White	Spanish Fork, Utah	Lindon police officer Joshua Boren (34) did not show up for work one night, prompting his commander to send officers to his home where they found the bodies of Boren's mother-in-law, wife, and two children, along with his own body. Police say the couple had been experiencing marital problems for several months.
2014-01-16	Kelly Boren (32)	White	Spanish Fork, Utah	Lindon police officer Joshua Boren (34) did not show up for work one night, prompting his commander to send officers to his home where they found the bodies of Boren's mother-in-law, wife, and two children, along with his own body. Police say the couple had been experiencing marital problems for several months.
2014-01-16	Joshua "Jaden" Boren (7)	White	Spanish Fork, Utah	Lindon police officer Joshua Boren (34) did not show up for work one night, prompting his commander to send officers to his home where they found the bodies of Boren's mother-in-law, wife, and two children, along with his own body. Police say the couple had been experiencing marital problems for several months.
2014-01-16	Haley Boren (5)	White	Spanish Fork, Utah	Lindon police officer Joshua Boren (34) did not show up for work one night, prompting his commander to send officers to his home where they found the bodies of Boren's mother-in-law, wife, and two children, along with his own body. Police say the couple had been experiencing marital problems for several months.
2014-01-15	Bernard Adams (75)	White	Houghton Lake, Michigan	Adams pulled a weapon and refused to put it down and was shot and killed.
2014-01-15	Shawn Walter Bair (22)	White	Elkhart, Indiana	Fatally shot after killing 2 people in a grocery store.
2014-01-14	Manuel Oscar Longoria (40)	Hispanic	Eloy, Arizona	Shot and later died at a hospital after a car chase.
2014-01-14	Gregory Vaughn Hill Jr (30)	Black	Fort Pierce, Florida	Shot multiple times though his garage door after he raised a gun at a deputy.
2014-01-14	William Jackson Marble (68)	White	Ludington, Michigan	Started as a 911 hang up, Marble was shot and killed after a confrontation with a Michigan state trooper.
2014-01-14	Steven Lewis Pfalzgraf (24)	White	Parkersburg, West Virginia	Drove car toward officer and was shot and killed.
2014-01-14	Paul Smith (58)	Black	Los Angeles, California	
2014-01-12	Enrique Carlos Rodarte (32)	Hispanic	Victorville, California	Died after not following commands from officers, he was shot in front of his family.
2014-01-12	Anthony Mascarino (35)	White	Scottsdale, Arizona	Pointed shotgun at police after firing it into air in his home.
2014-01-11	Jose Luis Navarro (40)	Hispanic	San Diego, California	Jose Luis Navarro critically injured on January 9th and died on the 11th. There is a video of the shooting.
2014-01-10	Ragland, Jeffrey (50)		Queens, New York	Corrections officer saw Ragland hitting his past girlfriend, which was his current girlfriend and intervened.
2014-01-09	Michael Anthony Ware (35)	White	Jonesboro, Arkansas	Is said to have opened his door and opened fire on officers, he was shot and killed by officer Eidson.
2014-01-07	Ernest Attebery (40)	White	Moriarty, New Mexico	Was said to have fired at officer however later reports say he never did. The SWAT member involved had another fatal shooting less the a year of this.
2014-01-07	Vernum Blunk (47)	White	Leesburg, Florida	Officers were investigating allegations of sexual misconduct with a child. Blunk was armed with a handgun.
2014-01-06	Shon Aaron Spencer (49)	White	Clarksburg, West Virginia	Shot after trying to run into a sheriff's vehicle.
2014-01-06	Deacon James Clark (30)	White	Sarasota, Florida	Bike patrol officers shot and killed him after he allegedly refused to drop his weapon. Officers fired 31 bullets.
2014-01-05	Igor Skorev (23)	White	Arvada, Colorado	Died after a shootout with police.
2014-01-05	Rocendo Arias (23)	Hispanic	Yakima, Washington	An officer was checking on a suspicious vehicle in a car wash's parking lot. During the contact, the officer shot Arias, the sole occupant of the vehicle. He was pronounced dead at the scene.
2014-01-05	Keith Vidal (18)	White	Boiling Spring Lakes, North Carolina	A man called police to help with his stepson, Keith Vidal, who was having a schizophrenic episode. Vidal had a screwdriver in his hand, and when he refused to drop it officers first tased and then shot him, killing him. The officer who shot Vidal, Byron Vassey, was charged with voluntary manslaughter.
2014-01-05	Brandon Lee Melton (25)	White	Watauga, Texas	Was seen stabbing someone by police who opened fire. He was shot Friday died Saturday.
2014-01-04	Frankie Martinez (66)	Hispanic	Pueblo, Colorado	Police say he pointed a gun at SWAT members. Officers shot and killed him.
2014-01-04	Noah Scott (29)	White	Metairie, Louisiana	After allegedly stabbing his girlfriend he confronted police at his door with a knife, the officers shot and killed him.
2014-01-04	Jerry Delagarza (51)	Hispanic	Beeville, Texas	
2014-01-04	John Murray (31)	Unknown race	Paterson, New Jersey	An officer confronted Murray, believing that he matched the description of a man wanted for a home invasion. Police say Murray was armed with a knife and that a struggle ensued. The officer fired one round, killing him.
2014-01-04	Robert Coleman (30)	White	Lawrenceville, Georgia	Shot by officers responding to a burglary call, were already in area for a reported stabbing in which Coleman was the suspect.
2014-01-04	Michael Estrada (49)	White	Sierra Vista, Arizona	Estrada, was in the front yard of the residence brandishing a machete.
2014-01-04	Jesse J. Humphrey (30)	White	Selah, Washington	Police had a warrant to search the house. Jesse Humphrey made a shot from a long rifle, which led to the arrival of a SWAT team who killed the man.
2014-01-03	Joeshawn Edward Williams (21)	Black	Oklahoma City, Oklahoma	An off duty officer hired to act as security outside a strip mall spotted Williams standing near a 7-Eleven store in the area who matched the description of a robbery suspect. The suspect then refused to pull out his ID and ran into a nearby alley. Police Sgt. Jimmy Cortez fired at Williams when Williams allegedly crouched down and charged the officer.
2014-01-03	Keith Jason Martin (35)	White	Hondo, Texas	Border patrol agent believed he was having an affair with his wife, while on-duty drove 160 miles to shoot him.
2014-01-03	Patrick L. Jones (47)	White	Columbus, Ohio	Jones' neighbors said no one heard the gunfire as Columbus police Officer Solomon Seng shot and killed Patrick L. Jones, a developmentally disabled man who confronted police with a knife when they responded to a call for help about 9:20 p.m.
2014-01-02	Rasheik Calhoun (33)	Black	Crestview, Florida	SWAT was executing a warrant and suspect was killed after suspects opened fire on officers.
2014-01-02	Wesley Maldonado (35)	Hispanic	Thornton, Colorado	Maldonado was shot and killed after he led police on a high speed chase which ended in a Thornton apartment complex. Some witnesses to the shooting allege that police use of force was "excessive". Police allegedly found a firearm in the vehicle, after the pursuit, that had recently been fired.
2014-01-02	Michael Edward Schmidt (47)	White	Dallas, Texas	Michael Schmidt, a lawyer at the Schmidt Firm in Dallas, reported that his apartment was being burglarized. He was home with his 11-year-old daughter. Police stated that Michael Schmidt started shooting at police officers and officers returned fire and shot him dead.
2014-01-01	Shane Bridges (33)	White	Chelsea, Oklahoma	An unnamed Mayes County deputy responded to a call about a suicidal man, when he arrived at Bridges home the deputy found him standing on his porch with a gun, Bridges began shooting at the deputy and the deputy returned fire killing Bridges.
2014-01-01	Julius Michael Reese (20)	Black	Redford, Michigan	An armed man suspected in a series of carjackings in Redford and Detroit was shot and killed by police on New Year's Day.

== See also ==
- Death in custody § United States
- Henry A. Wallace Police Crime Public Database
- List of cases of police brutality
- List of countries with annual rates and counts for killings by law enforcement officers
- List of law enforcement officers killed in the line of duty in the United States
- List of law enforcement officers convicted for an on-duty killing in the United States
- List of shootings by US immigration agents
- List of police reforms related to the George Floyd protests
- List of unarmed African Americans killed by law enforcement officers in the United States
- Lists of killings by law enforcement officers
- Police brutality in the United States
- Police misconduct § United States
- Police riot § United States
- Police use of deadly force in the United States
