= Stein's Pass =

Mountain pass in New Mexico, United States

Stein's Pass, is a gap or mountain pass through the Peloncillo Mountains of Hidalgo County, New Mexico. The pass was named after United States Army Major Enoch Steen, who camped nearby in 1856, as he explored the recently acquired Gadsden Purchase. The pass is in the form of a canyon cut through the mountains through which Steins Creek flows to the west just west of the apex of the pass to the canyon mouth at 32°13′19″N 109°01′48″W.

== History ==
Stein's Pass and the canyon of Steins Creek to the west of it, allowed easy passage through the Peloncillo Mountains, between the Animas Valley and the San Simon Valley. Americans headed west in the California Gold Rush, in 1849 pioneered a shorter wagon road through the pass as part of a cutoff route from Cooke's Wagon Road from Santa Fe to Tucson and California. The pass, then in Mexican territory, was known to Mexican Army soldiers who guided a party of forty-niners led by John Coffee Hays west from Peloncillo Ranch on Cooke's road in the Animas Valley, through this pass, to Cienega of San Simon and on over Apache Pass and Nugent’s Pass to the lower crossing of San Pedro River, near Tres Alamos from which it ran southwest to link back up to Cooke's Road west of modern Benson, Arizona, avoiding the long haul south to Guadalupe Pass, (in what is now Sonora, Mexico just south of the modern Mexican, U. S. border), and back north along the San Pedro River to the vicinity west of Benson.

Subsequently, this became the major route of travel on this part of the Southern Emigrant Trail, and was used by the San Antonio-San Diego Mail Line, with the exception that Nugent's Pass was discarded in favor of Dragoon Pass as the shorter route to the San Pedro River crossing. A shorter route through Doubtful Canyon used by the Butterfield Overland Mail supplanted this pass for the stagecoach route until the outbreak of the Apache War with Cochise made it unsafe and the Steins Pass route again became the route of choice for many years. Stein's Pass became the route the Southern Pacific Railroad used in crossing the Peloncillo Mountains, and the station, later the town of Stein's Pass was founded just east of the summit of the pass.

Today the route of Interstate 10, goes through Stein's Pass.
