= Skirmish in Doubtful Canyon =

Part of the Apache Wars (1864)

Coordinates: 32.31905°N 109.08360°W

- Part of the Apache Wars, American Civil War
Date	May 3, 1864
Location	Doubtful Canyon, Peloncillo Mountains, Arizona Territory; now in Hidalgo County, New Mexico
Result	United States victory

Belligerents
United States	Apache

Commanders and leaders
(United States) Henry H. Stevens	Unknown

Strength
54	~100

Casualties and losses
5 or 6 wounded, 1 missing	10 killed, 20 wounded

The Skirmish in Doubtful Canyon took place on May 3, 1864, between a company of infantry from the California Column and a band of about 100 Apaches. The fighting occurred near Steins Peak in Doubtful Canyon, Arizona Territory. Doubtful Canyon, along with Apache Pass and Cookes Canyon, was a favored location for an ambush by the Apache along the Butterfield Overland Mail route.

The Californians were on the march from Fort Cummings to Fort Bowie in the military District of Arizona, when they were attacked in the canyon. The band of Apaches were defeated by 54 men of Company I, 5th California Volunteer Infantry Regiment under Lieutenant Henry H. Stevens. The skirmish lasted about an hour until the Apache fled. The Apache lost 10 killed and 20 wounded. The Californians lost 1 missing and 5 wounded according to official records. Michno claims the battle lasted almost two hours and that the Californians suffered 6 wounded (1 mortally), and 1 missing, presumed killed.
