= Geronimo Surrender Site =

- U.S. National Register of Historic Places
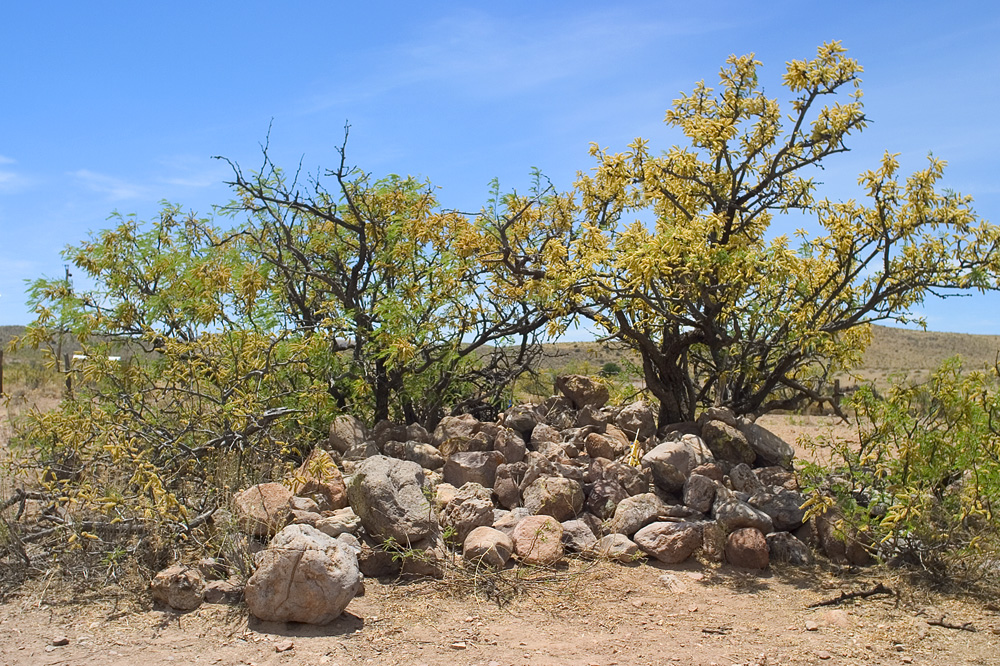

- Location within Arizona Location within the United States
- Location: 45 miles northeast of Douglas, Arizona
- Coordinates: 31°35′59″N 109°04′24″W
- NRHP reference No.: 98000170
- Added to NRHP: March 6, 1998

The Geronimo Surrender Site is situated above Skeleton Canyon in southeastern Arizona, on a small bluff. Overlooking the canyon, the San Bernardino Valley and San Simon Valley can be seen to the east and west. The actual site is marked by a cairn of rocks, which was erected by Lieutenant Henry W. Lawton, on the spot where Geronimo surrendered to General Nelson A. Miles in 1886.

== History ==
In 1876, in Arizona, the U. S. Government ushered in an era of concentrating Native Americans in reservations, which in turn triggered a wave of violence between Indians and white settlers. In 1872, the Chiricahua, under the leadership of Cochise, signed a peace treaty with General Otis O. Howard, agreeing to cease hostilities in exchange for the government creating a reservation in southeast Arizona. Taza, took over leadership of the Chiricahua in 1874 after Cochise's death. Factions among the tribe were split about whether or not to move to the reservation. In 1876 Indian agent John P. Clum convinced a portion of the tribe to move to the reservation, but approximately 400 of them refused and fled to the Sierra Madre range in Mexico. These were split into three groups, one of which was led by Geronimo.

In April 1877, Clum surrounded the Apache resistors in New Mexico. The Indians, including Geronimo, surrendered and were taken to the San Carlos Indian Reservation. However, in September of that year, Victorio led an escape of some 310 Chiricahua from the reservation, and they remained at large for two years. The conditions and deprivations on the reservation led to discontent amongst the Indians. After the Cibecue Creek Massacre in late summer 1881, the Chiricahua feared reprisals. In September of that year, a small group, led by Geronimo, among others, escaped from the reservation, heading down to the Sierra Madre in Mexico. A second group, led by Natiotish, also escaped into the Arizona mountains. The 6th Cavalry tracked them down and defeated them in the Battle of Big Dry Wash in July 1882. The Chiricahua survivors were brought back to the San Carlos Reservation. In September 1882, General George Crook was put in charge of military operations in Arizona. His first command was to appoint new commanders on the reservation, tasked with improving conditions.

Crook then negotiated an agreement with Mexican President Porfirio Diaz to allow U. S. troops to cross into Mexico. In 1883, Crook led an expedition into Mexico and subdued Apache forces under the leadership of Chato, bringing the remaining forces back to the San Carlos Reservation. By the spring of 1884, all the Apache bands had been returned to the reservation, with Geronimo's band being the last to return. Geronimo and his people were sent to the Fort Apache Reservation. In May 1885, Geronimo led a group of approximately 140 men, women, and children out of the reservation, fleeing once again to Mexico. In February 1886, it had been mistakenly reported that Geronimo had surrendered in New Mexico, to a Lieutenant Marion Maus. However, that report turned out to be incorrect. In March 1886, Crook negotiated a surrender with Geronimo at Canyon de los Embudos. On March 25, Crook thought he had an agreement, and left to return to Arizona. He left the Indians under the control of Lieutenant Maus. However, that night, the Chiricahua argued amongst themselves. While Chihuahua led the majority of the Chiricahua back to the reservation, Geronimo led a small band of about 35 men and women into the mountains.

Crook was relieved of his command, replaced by General Nelson A. Miles. Miles planned to remove all the Chiricahua from Arizona, and relocate them to reservations in Florida, thinking that would alleviate their resistance. Miles dispatched Captain Henry W. Lawton and Lt. Charles B. Gatewood to track down and capture the remaining Apaches in Mexico. On August 24, 1886, they caught up with Geronimo, and Gatewood informed Geronimo about the impending relocation to Florida. This deflated Geronimo, and he agreed to surrender, however, he would only surrender to Miles. The U. S. soldiers began escorting the Apache north into Arizona. They met with General Miles in Skeleton Canyon, arriving on August 28. Miles arrived on September 3. Geronimo and Miles met on September 3 and 4, agreeing to the terms of the surrender. After the agreement was signed, Captain Lawton erected the cairn of stones to commemorate the agreement. It was approximately ten feet across at its base and six feet high. Lawton wrote down a list of the officers present at the signing, placed it in a bottle, and put the bottle in the cairn.

== The site ==
While there has been some confusion in the past regarding the exact location of the treaty site. The National Forest Service, relying on oral testimony, thought the treaty had been signed on the floor of the canyon. However, the physical characteristics of the site with the stone cairn on the bluff make it the likely location. It is a small bluff overlooking Skeleton Canyon, which has broad views of both the San Bernardino and San Simon Valleys. It is this view which is one of the indicators that the treaty was signed on the bluff, as locations such as this were favored by Geronimo for parleys. Another fact is that the valley did not have enough room to accommodate all those present at the signing ceremony. There is a cairn of rocks on the site, which was placed there by Lieutenant Henry W. Lawton after Geronimo surrendered to General Nelson A. Miles on September 4, 1886. It is this rock pile which is the final piece of evidence for the spot. Finally, several experts on the Apache Wars were consulted: Jay Van Orden, Bill Hoy, and Larry Ludwig. All agreed that the location was on the bluff.

The cairn originally stood ten feet across and six feet high. It has since been disturbed by individuals searching to see if it contained anything. It commemorates the signing of the treaty between Geronimo and General Miles, which is considered the most important treaty by the U. S. Government and Indians in Arizona, and effectively ended a forty-year period of hostilities between the two parties in the Arizona Territory.
