= Grass valley =

Meadow within a forested and relatively small drainage basin

A grass valley (also vega and valle) is a meadow located within a forested and relatively small drainage basin such as a headwater. Grass valleys are common in North America, where they are created and maintained principally by the work of beavers or browser feeders. Rarely, they are associated with cienegas.

The words vega and valle are loanwords from Spanish.

== Notable examples ==
- Valles Caldera, New Mexico
- Las Vegas Springs Preserve, Nevada
- South Park, Colorado

== See also ==
- Rincon (meadow)
