= San Simon River (Arizona) =

River in the United States

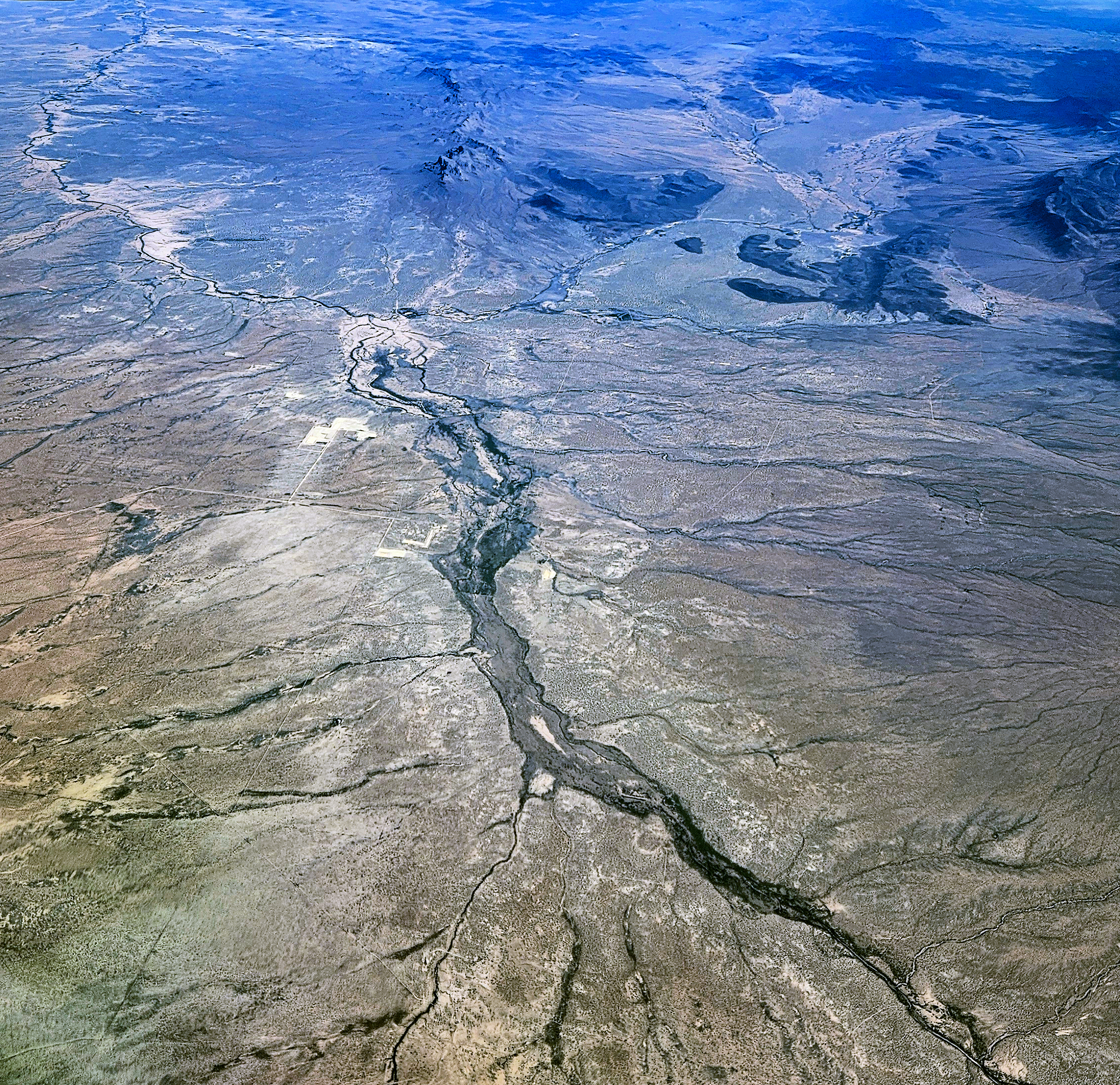
San Simon River from the air looking north

San Simon River is an ephemeral river, or stream running through the San Simon Valley in Graham and Cochise County, Arizona and Hidalgo County, New Mexico. Its mouth is at its confluence with the Gila River at Safford in Graham County. Its source is located at 31°51′21″N 109°01′27″W.

== History ==
The San Simon River was originally named by the Spanish, Rio San Domingo, had acquired various names, Rio de Sauz, Rio Sauz or Sauz River, Rio de Sonoca, Rio de Suanca or Suauca, San Simon Creek, San Simon Wash, and Solomonville Wash. In 1849, when Colonel John Coffee Hays pioneered a new shorter cut off route from Cooke's Wagon Road in the Animas Valley to Tucson by way of the Puerto del Dado (Apache Pass) and Nugent’s Pass, the Cienega of San Simon, (on the river, 5 miles southwest of the mouth of Stein's Pass, and 13 miles up river from where the Butterfield Overland Mail crossed the river near modern San Simon, Arizona), 32°13′20″N 109°1′32″W, became a water and camping place on the Southern Emigrant Trail With a diversion to Dragoon Pass in place of Nugents Pass, this became part of the original route of the San Antonio-San Diego Mail Line. The Butterfield Overland Mail followed a new route through Soldier's Farewell Stage Station, Stein's Peak Station and Doubtful Canyon until the beginning of the American Civil War when the attacks by the Apache in the Peloncillo Mountains made it too dangerous and travelers followed the old Hays route.

== See also ==
- List of rivers of Arizona
- List of rivers of New Mexico
