= San Simon Cienaga =

Wetlands on the San Simon River, Hidalgo County, New Mexico

Coordinates: 32°03′03″N 109°2′15″W

San Simon Cienaga, a cienega, on the San Simon River in Hidalgo County, New Mexico.
