= Enoch Steen =

United States Army officer and western explorer

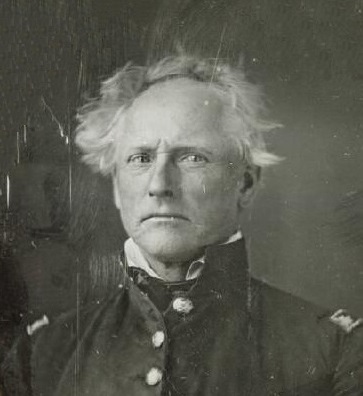
- Major Enoch Steen
- Born: February 22, 1800; Harrodsburg, Kentucky, US
- Died: January 22, 1880 (aged 79); Jackson County, Missouri, US
- Military career
- Allegiance: United States of America
- Branch: United States Army
- Service years: 1832–1866
- Rank: Lieutenant Colonel
- Units: 1st United States Dragoons; 2nd United States Cavalry
- Commands: Fort Webster (New Mexico); Fort Buchanan (Arizona); Fort Walla Walla (Washington); Union Army fort at Sandy Hook (New York Harbor); Fort Lyon (Colorado)
- Conflicts: Mexican-American War: Battle of Buena Vista; American Indian Wars: Apache Wars (1849-1857); Paiute War; Utah War American Civil War

Signature
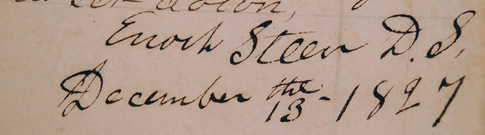

Enoch Steen (February 22, 1800 – January 22, 1880) was a United States military officer and western explorer. He joined the United States Army in 1832, serving at posts throughout the United States, including many remote locations in the west. During his military service, Steen explored parts of the western United States including large areas of southern New Mexico and southeastern Oregon. He served as the commander of several Union Army forts during the American Civil War. Today, there are landmarks in Oklahoma, Oregon, and New Mexico named in his honor; however, many of the place names are misspelled as Stein.

== Early life ==
Steen was born on 22 February 1800 in Harrodsburg, Kentucky. His parents were Frederick Steen and Katherine Rector Steen. He was the third of five children. His family moved to Missouri when he was young. Growing up on the American frontier, Steen became a well known woodsman and hunter. As a young man, Steen worked as a surveyor before joining the volunteer Mounted Rangers as a second lieutenant on 16 July 1832.

== Junior officer duty ==
Steen transferred to the United States Army's 1st United States Dragoons as a second lieutenant on 19 September 1833. He was one of the initial cadre of officers to stand-up this historic cavalry unit. In 1834, he was stationed at 1st Dragoon headquarters at Fort Leavenworth, Kansas. In 1835, he accompanied Colonel Henry Dodge on an expedition up the Platte River, following its south fork to the Rocky Mountains and then returning by way of Bent's Fort, the Arkansas River, and the Santa Fe Trail. Later that year, Steen joined Colonel Stephen W. Kearny on an expedition along the Platte and then east to the Missouri River, meeting with Potawatomi Indians at Council Bluffs before returning to Fort Leavenworth.

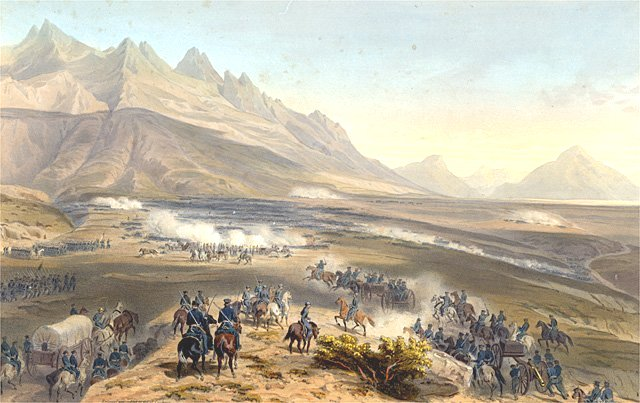
Captain Steen was wounded at the Battle of Buena Vista

Steen was promoted to first lieutenant on 5 March 1836 and then captain on 31 December 1840. While the record is not clear, it appears Steen was stationed at Fort Gibson in the Indian Territory during this period. It is known that he dispatched a detachment of dragoons from that location to escort a wagon train to Santa Fe in 1843.

Steen began the Mexican War as a captain. He departed San Antonio, Texas on 29 September 1846, leading two companies of dragoons assigned to escort General John E. Wool and his staff to the front in Mexico. During the Battle of Buena Vista on 23 February 1847, Steen led a detachment of cavalry in a charge against a large body of Mexican lancers who were attempting to capture a United States Army supply train. Steen's attack broke and dispersed the Mexican lancer formation, saving the Army's supplies. Steen was severely wounded during the battle, earning a brevet promotion to major for personal gallantry and meritorious conduct. Steen's brevet promotion was effective as of 23 February 1847, the day of the battle.

== New Mexico ==
In the summer of 1849, Steen escorted a civilian party from Fort Leavenworth to Santa Fe in New Mexico Territory. After completing his escort duty, he established and commanded an Army outpost at Doña Ana in southern New Mexico. From there, Steen with a detachment of 50 cavalrymen tracked a band of Mimbres Apache raiders to the Santa Rita copper mines. Steen and his men engaged and defeated the Indians on 16 August 1849. However, Steen was badly wounded during the battle. This was the first military engagement between the United States Army and Apache warriors.

In June 1850, Steen led an expedition through the Organ Mountains, around the southern edge of the White Sands desert area and into Mescalero Apache country when he ran into a superior Indian force, and he withdrew to Doña Ana. Based on his reconnaissance, Steen recommended that an Army post be established near the Santa Rita mines. The Army agreed with Steen's recommendation, and Fort Webster was established in 1852. Steen was assigned as the fort's first commander.

However, before taking command, Steen was sent back east to lead 183 Army recruits to New Mexico for duty. Steen finally took command of Fort Webster on 7 April 1853. Shortly after taking command, he successfully negotiated peace treaties with Mangas Colorado, head chief of the Mimbreno Apaches and Victorio, war chief of the Mimbreno Apaches. In May 1853, Steen escorted William Carr Lane from Fort Webster to the Gila River. It was probably during this trip that Steins Peak and Stein's Pass in southwestern New Mexico acquired their place names. Both were important reference points for frontier travelers. Steen was promoted to the permanent grade of major on 15 July 1853. While he was on leave the post of Fort Webster was abandoned, and Fort Thorn opened on the Rio Grande. Upon his return in May 1854 Steen took command of that post until December. In 1856, Steen negotiated an agreement with Cochise, chief of the Chiricahua Apaches, allowing settlers to cross Apache land while traveling to California.

In 1857, Steen helped establish Camp Moore near present-day Rio Rico, Arizona. In 1858, Steen established Fort Buchanan in the newly acquired Gadsden Purchase (near present-day Sonoita, Arizona), and became the post's first commander. He hoped the outpost would deter Chiricahua Apache raids in the Sonoita Valley area. Later that year, he escorted a survey party led by Lieutenant Edward Beale along a proposed road route from Fort Smith, Arkansas to the Colorado River. During the trip, Steen's Buttes in Caddo County, Oklahoma was named in his honor. Steen then led six companies of cavalry into Utah as the Mormon War was coming to a close.

== Oregon ==
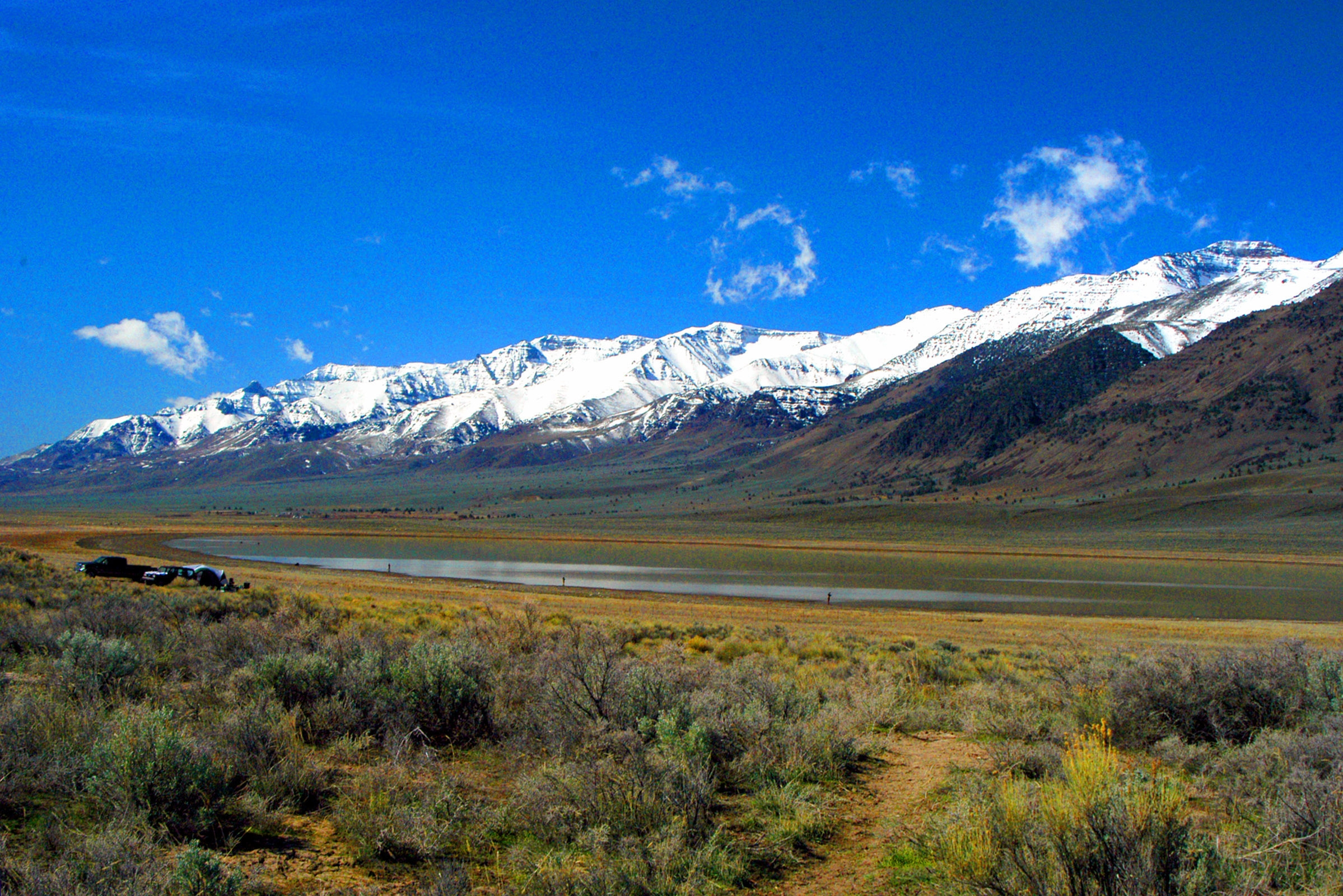
Steens Mountain is the tallest peak in southeast Oregon

By 1860, Steen was posted in Oregon. On 28 March of that year, General William S. Harney ordered him to lead an expedition from Fort Dalles to Harney Lake, a distance of 275 miles (443 km). Steen's party followed the Walla Walla road to the mouth of the Deschutes River. He then turned south passing through the Ochoco highlands and the Trout Creek area before exploring the upper Deschutes River country. Near Pilot Butte, Steen turned east toward Harney Lake conducting road survey work along the way. While en route, another Army survey party led by Captain Andrew J. Smith was attacked by Indians north of Harney Lake. Steen immediately abandoned his survey work and proceeded to the Harney Lake where he joined Smith and his party. To protect the survey teams in the area, Steen established Camp Union on Silver Creek, 30 miles (48 km) north of Harney Lake.

On a reconnaissance expedition from Camp Union, Steen explored the country along the Donner und Blitzen River, south of Harney Lake. After a skirmish with Paiute Indians in that area, he chased the Indians over a rugged peak that Hudson's Bay Company trapper, John Work, called Snow Mountain. After Steen and his men crossed the mountain in pursuit of the Indians, the peak became known as Steens Mountain.

In late 1860, Steen was given command of Fort Walla Walla in the Washington Territory. He remained there until the outbreak of the American Civil War.

== Civil War ==
In April 1861, Confederate force attacked Fort Sumter, initiating the Civil War. On 3 August 1861, Steen was assigned to the 1st Cavalry Regiment and ordered to return to the east coast. On 28 September, he was promoted to lieutenant colonel, reassigned to the 2nd Cavalry Regiment, and posted to Cantonment Holt near Washington, D.C.. Steen remained there until June 1862, when he was sent to Fort Craig in the New Mexico Territory.

While Steen remained loyal to the Union, his son, Alexander Early Steen, served as a brigadier general in the Confederate Army. He was killed on 7 December 1862 at the Battle of Prairie Grove in Arkansas.

In March 1863, Steen was reassigned to Benton Barracks in Missouri. On 23 September 1863, he was officially retired from the Army at Benton Barracks, for incapacity resulting from long and faithful service and wounds received in the line of duty. However, Steen continued to serve on active duty in various capacities. On 30 September 1863, he was placed in command of the Union Army's fort at Sandy Hook, New Jersey, overlooking New York Harbor. In 1866, Steen was sent to the Colorado Territory to command Fort Lyon.

== Later life ==
When Congress passed a law prohibiting retired officers from serving on active duty, Steen left the Army. He settled on a farm in Jackson County, Missouri. Steen died at his Jackson County home on 22 January 1880. He is buried at Mount St. Mary's Cemetery in Kansas City, Missouri.

== Legacy ==
Steen played an important part in the history of the western United States, leading military expeditions through large areas of the west. As a result of his early explorations, there are landmarks in Oklahoma, Oregon, and New Mexico named in his honor.

In Oklahoma's Caddo County, a group of three of sandstone hills were named Steen's Buttes by Lieutenant Edward Beale whose survey team was escorted by cavalry under Major Steen's command.

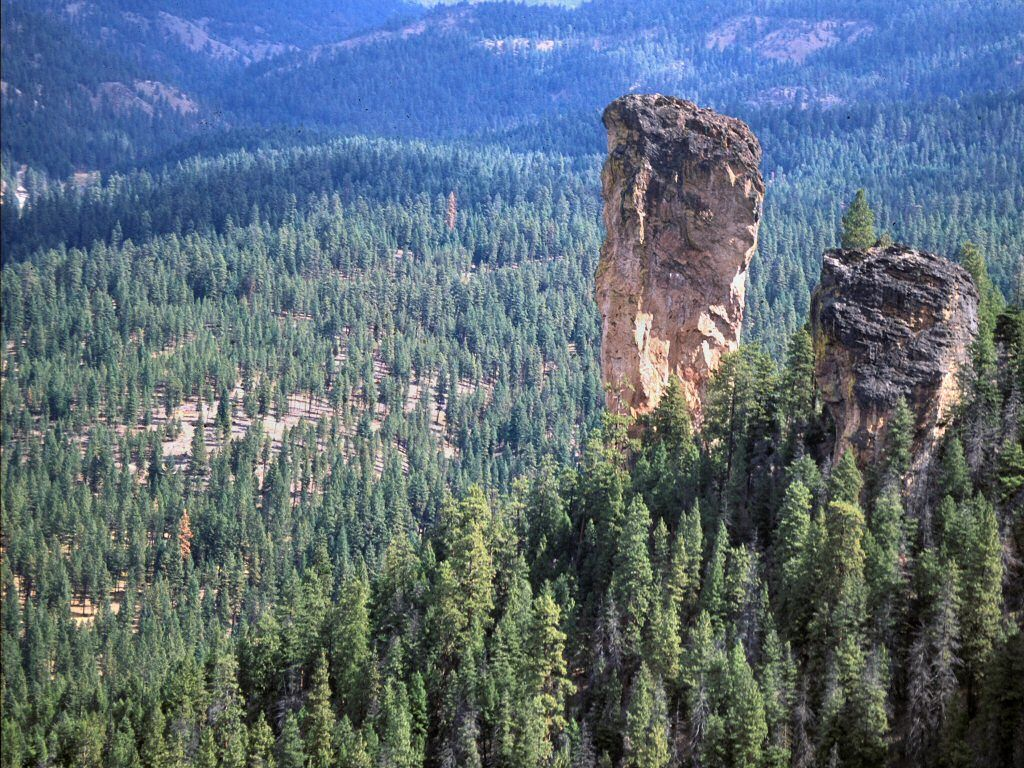
Steins Pillar in central Oregon was named for Major Steen

The most prominent landmark that bears Steen's name is Steens Mountain in Harney County, Oregon. With a 9,733 feet (2,967 m) summit, Steens Mountain is the highest peak in southeastern Oregon. The mountain extends over 50 miles (80 km) north to south. As a result, it is often mistaken for mountain range rather than a single peak. Another Oregon landmark named in honor of Steen is Steins Pillar. It is a 350-foot (110 m) high rock column in the Ochoco Mountains of central Oregon. Because of an overhanging ledge near its summit, the pillar was not successfully climbed until 1950.

There is also ghost town in New Mexico named Steins. The town site is located just off Interstate 10 in Hidalgo County. It was originally called Stein's Pass after the nearby pass through the Peloncillo Mountains, where Steen camped in 1856 while exploring the Gadsden Purchase. The town was founded in 1880 as a fueling stop for the Southern Pacific Railroad. In the early 1900s, the town had 1,300 residents; however, the population slowly declined until the town disappeared.

In southwest New Mexico, there are two mountains and a stream named in Steen's honor. Steins Mountain is located 1.5 miles (2.4 km) northwest of the Steins town site. The summit of Steins Mountain is 5,459 feet (1,664 m) above sea level. Stein Peak is located 6.5 miles (10.5 km) to the northwest of Stein's Mountain. Its summit elevation is 5,715 feet (1,742 m). Both mountains are part of the Peloncillo Range. Steins Creek begins on the southern slope of Steins Mountain and flows southwest across the New Mexico border into Arizona.
