= Apache, Arizona =

- Populated place
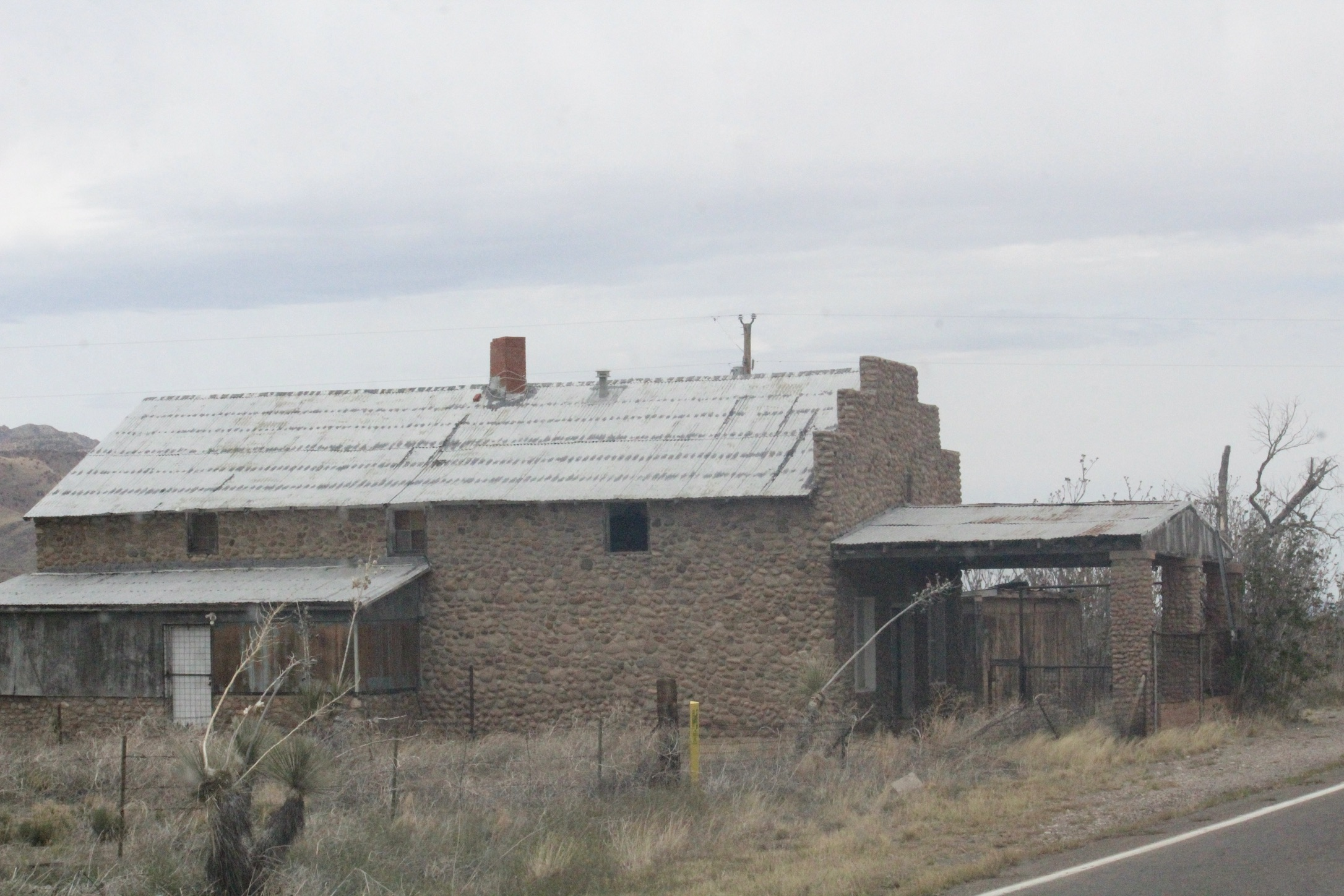
- Building in Apache

- Location of Apache in Arizona
- Coordinates: 31°41′25″N 109°07′56″W
- Country: United States
- State: Arizona
- County: Cochise
- Elevation: 4,383 ft (1,336 m)
- Time zone: UTC-7 (Mountain (MST))
  - Summer (DST): UTC-7 (MST)
- Area code: 520
- FIPS code: 04-02480
- GNIS feature ID: 24304

Apache is a ghost town in Cochise County, Arizona, United States. It has an estimated elevation of 4,383 feet (1,336 m) above sea level.

== History ==
Apache is the site of the Geronimo Surrender Monument, a memorial dedicated to the site of Geronimo's surrender, and the end of Native American wars in the US.

Apache's population was 38 in 1940, and was 15 in the 1960 census.

== Education ==
Apache is the site of Apache Elementary School, a one-room schoolhouse with an enrollment (in 2017) of eight students as of 2018.
