= Ciénega =

Wetland system unique to the American Southwest

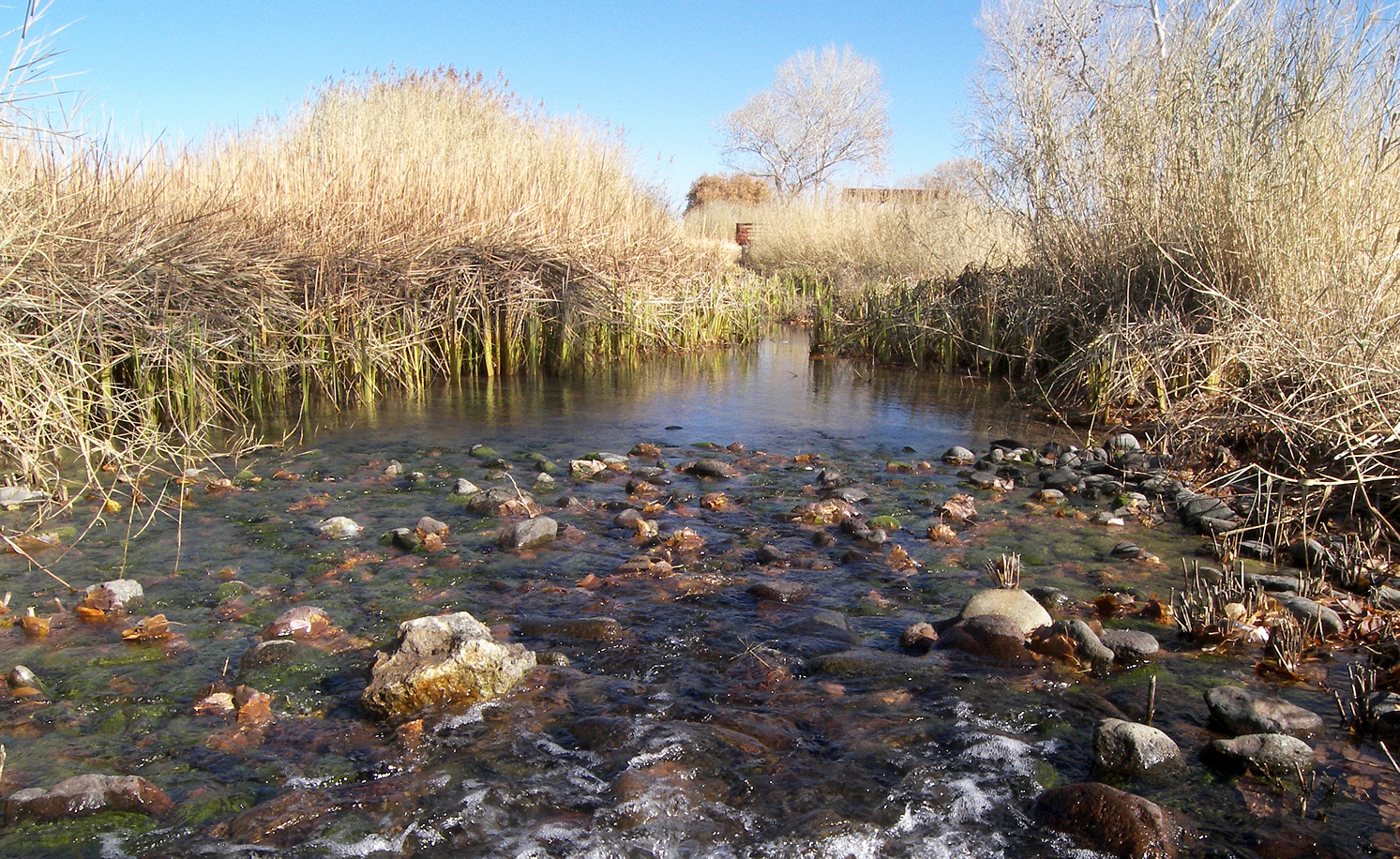
A restored cienega in Balmorhea State Park

A ciénega (also spelled ciénaga) is a wetland system unique to the American Southwest and Northern Mexico. Ciénegas are alkaline, freshwater, spongy, wet meadows with shallow-gradient, permanently saturated soils in otherwise arid landscapes that often occupy nearly the entire widths of valley bottoms. That description satisfies historic, pre-damaged ciénegas, although few can be described that way anymore and incised ciénegas have become common. Ciénegas are usually associated with seeps or springs, found in canyon headwaters or along margins of streams. ciénegas often occur because the geomorphology forces water to the surface, over large areas, not merely through a single pool or channel. In a healthy ciénega, water slowly migrates through long, wide-scale mats of thick, sponge-like wetland sod. Ciénega soils are squishy, permanently saturated, highly organic, black in color or anaerobic. Highly adapted sedges, rushes and reeds are the dominant plants, with succession plants—Goodding's willow, Fremont cottonwoods and scattered Arizona walnuts—found on drier margins, down-valley in healthy ciénegas where water goes underground or along the banks of incised ciénegas.

Ciénegas are not considered true swamps due to their lack of trees, which will drown in historic ciénegas. However, trees do grow in many damaged or drained ciénegas, making the distinction less clear.

== Current state ==
The distribution and conservation status of ciénegas of Arizona and adjacent New Mexico were first inventoried and assessed systematically in 1985. Characterized by slow-moving, broad flows through extensive emergent vegetation, intact ciénegas were then rare, but reviews of historic accounts of the surface waters and landscapes of that region indicated they were previously extensive. Broadscale incision of ciénegas and conversion of large segments of former ciénegas to ephemeral surface flows through deeply incised former ciénega-formed soils, was hypothesized to have occurred predominantly in the late 1800s as a result of overgrazing, water diversions, and changing climates. More recent updates and geographically broadened inventories and status assessments of ciénegas now extend throughout Arizona and New Mexico eastward into Texas and south into Chihuahua and Sonora, México. Though often diverse local factors have clearly played major roles in altering some former ciénegas, the hypothesis of ongoing region-wide erosion since arrival of Europeans, and subsequent alteration of the land and aquifers (including more recent pumping of them), has been generally supported. "Since the late 1800s, natural wetlands in arid and semi-arid desert grasslands of the American Southwest and Northern Mexico have largely disappeared." Historic ciénegas are now deeply entrenched and generally dry, or left with far less-permanent, often now ephemeral water. Broad grasslands adjacent to former ciénegas, once supported by shallow and stable groundwater maintained by ciénegas, are gone, replaced largely by mesquite and other arid-land vegetation, sometimes with narrow, remnant ciénegas persisting in deeply incised channels. Additional resources about ciénegas are available, including an extensive bibliography of relevant literature.

Ciénegas in progressive states from healthy to dead

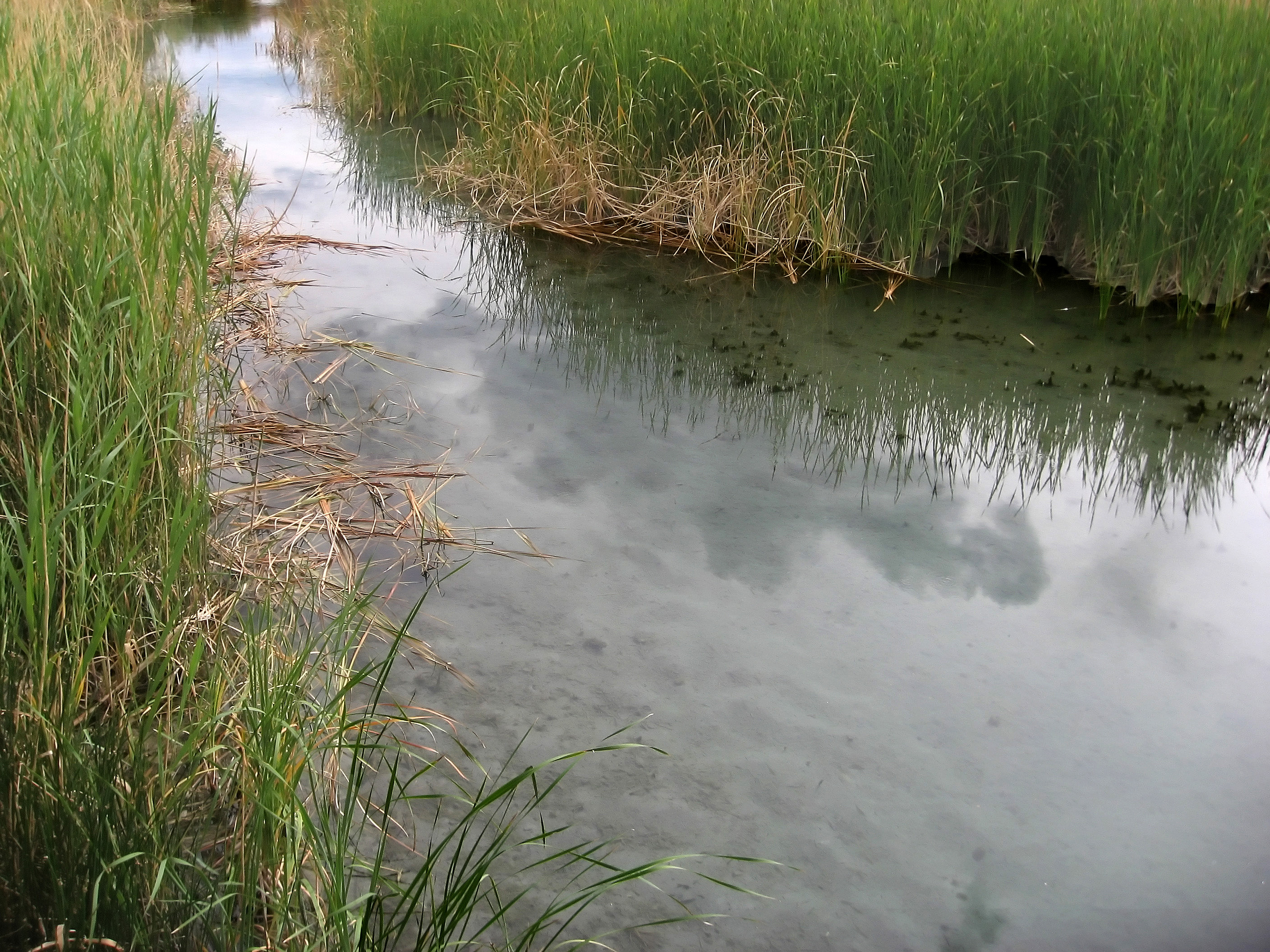
San Solomon Spring-fed ciénega, near Balmorhea, is in arid West Texas. The springs have a tremendous flow of 22 to 28 million gallons a day. (2009)

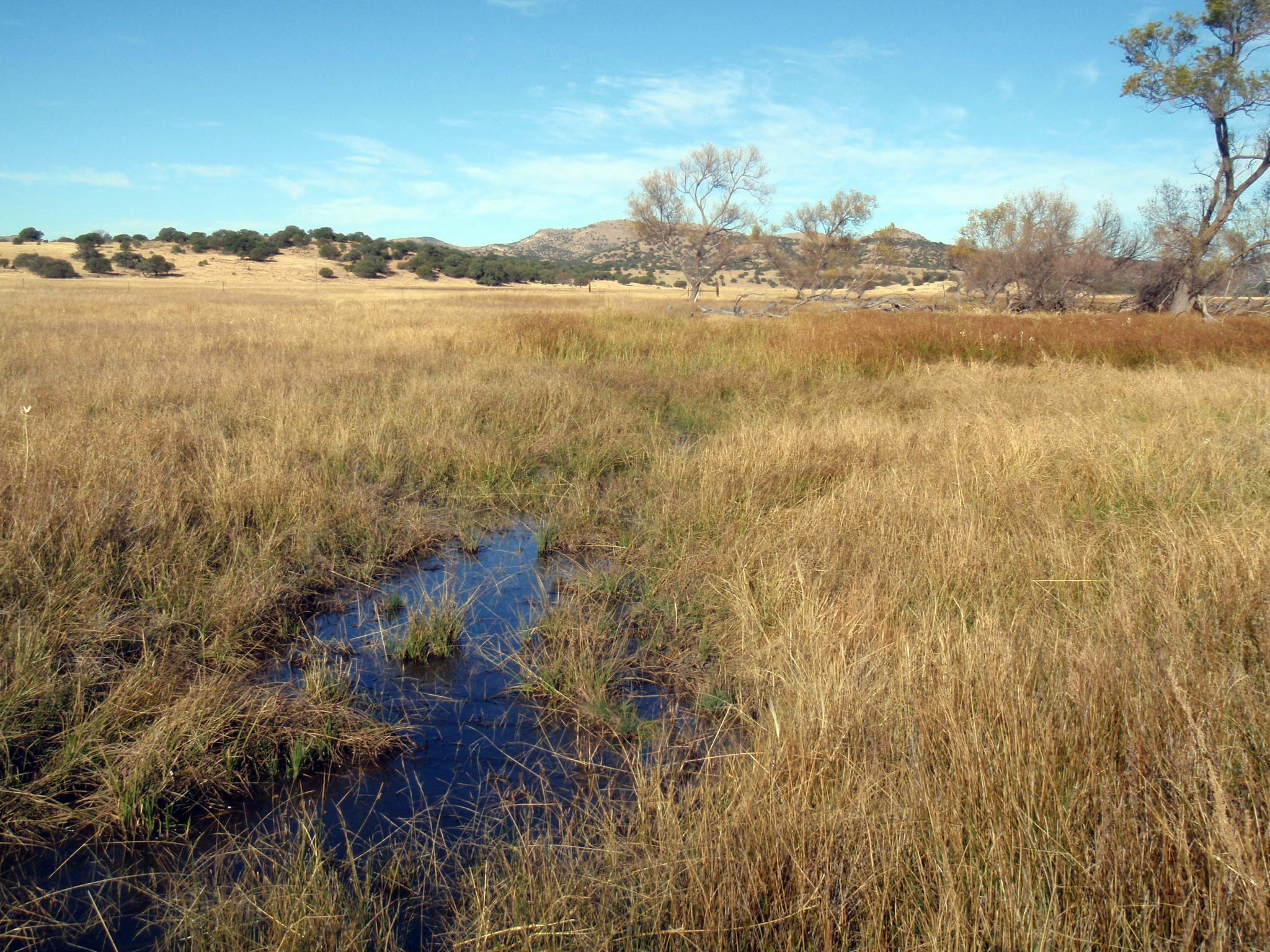
Cloverdale Ciénega in the Bootheel area of southwest New Mexico, illustrating what an undamaged ciénega looks like under normal conditions: marsh-like, broad, shallow, slow-migrating water through thick vegetation (2008)

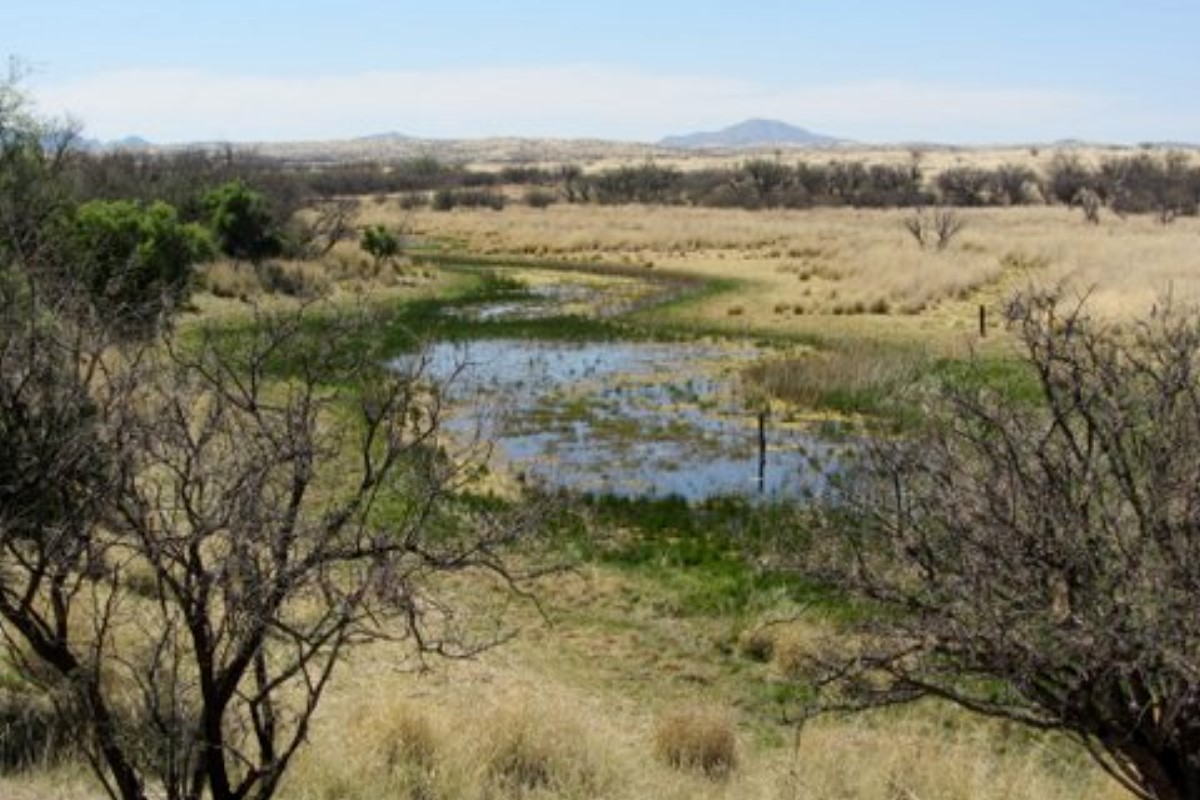
Cienequita, Las Ciénegas, southeast of Tucson, Arizona. With very little incising, this is a smaller, functioning ciénega. (2012)

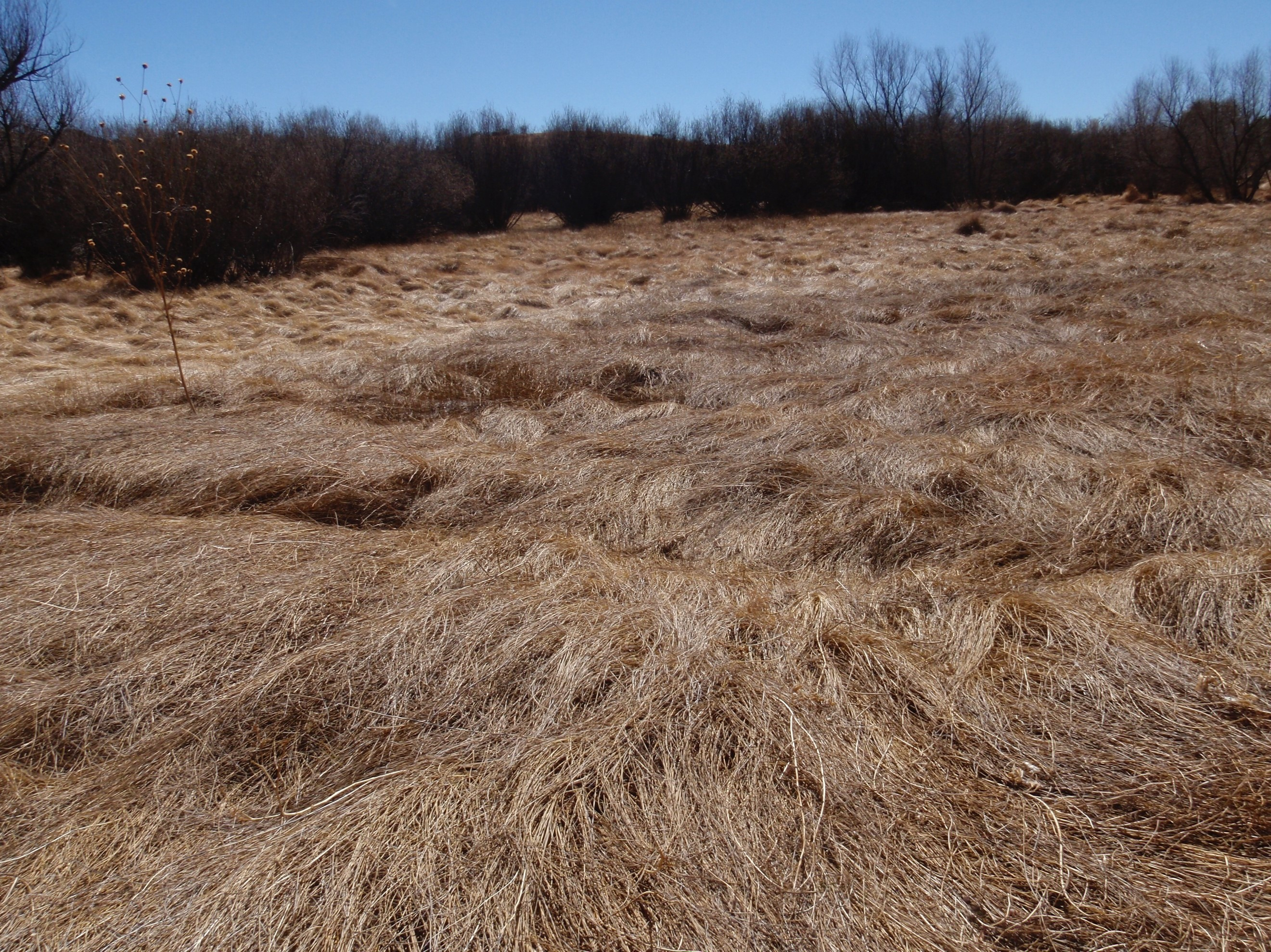
Canelo Hills, Arizona. This is what a healthy ciénega looks like after a flood; erosion is avoided by plants that lie down and spring back after heavy flows (2009)

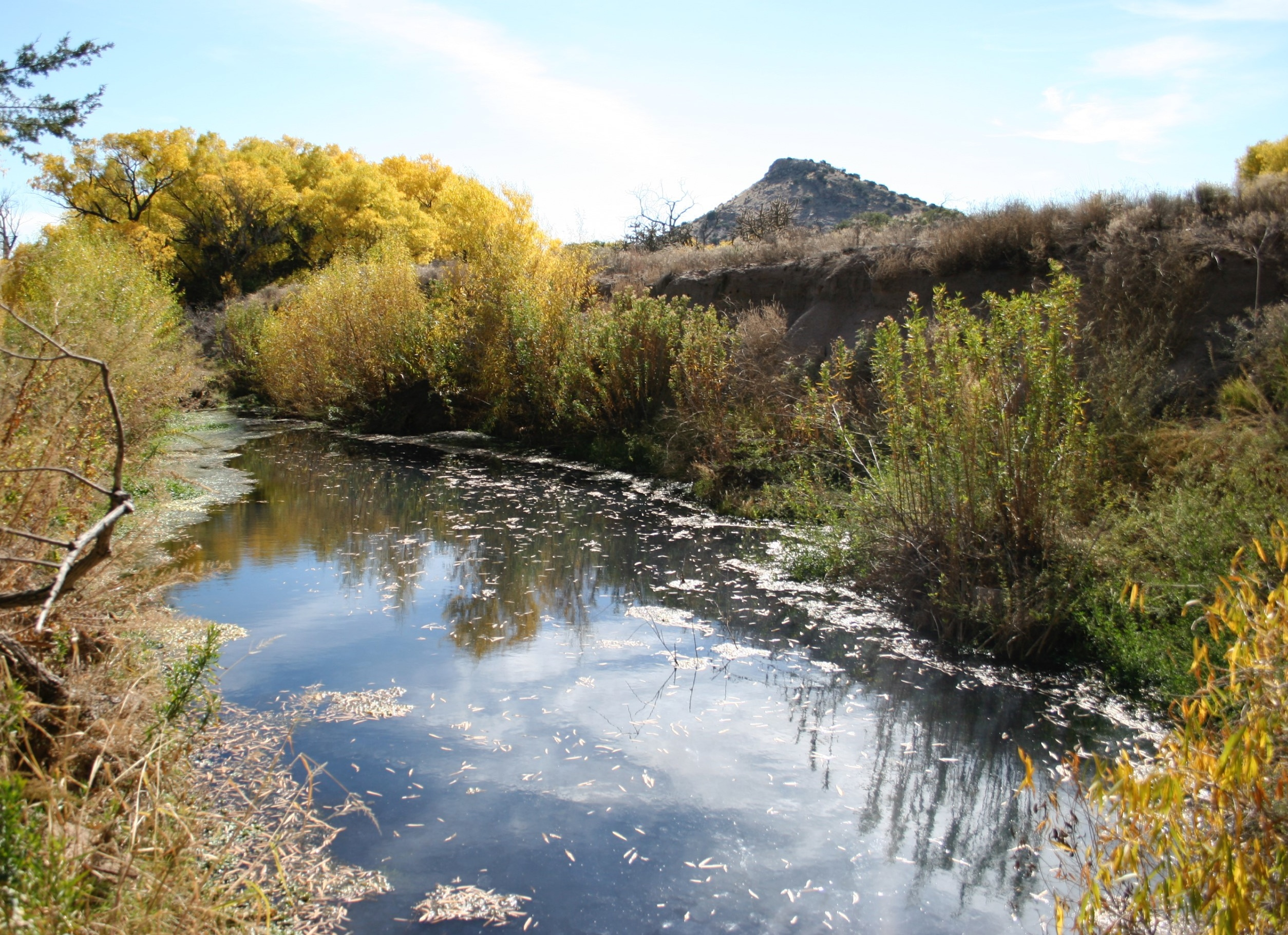
Burro Ciénega on the Pitchfork Ranch south of Silver City, New Mexico. Today, many of the few remaining ciénegas that still have water look like this, deeply incised by fast-flowing water trapped between vertical walls. (2005)

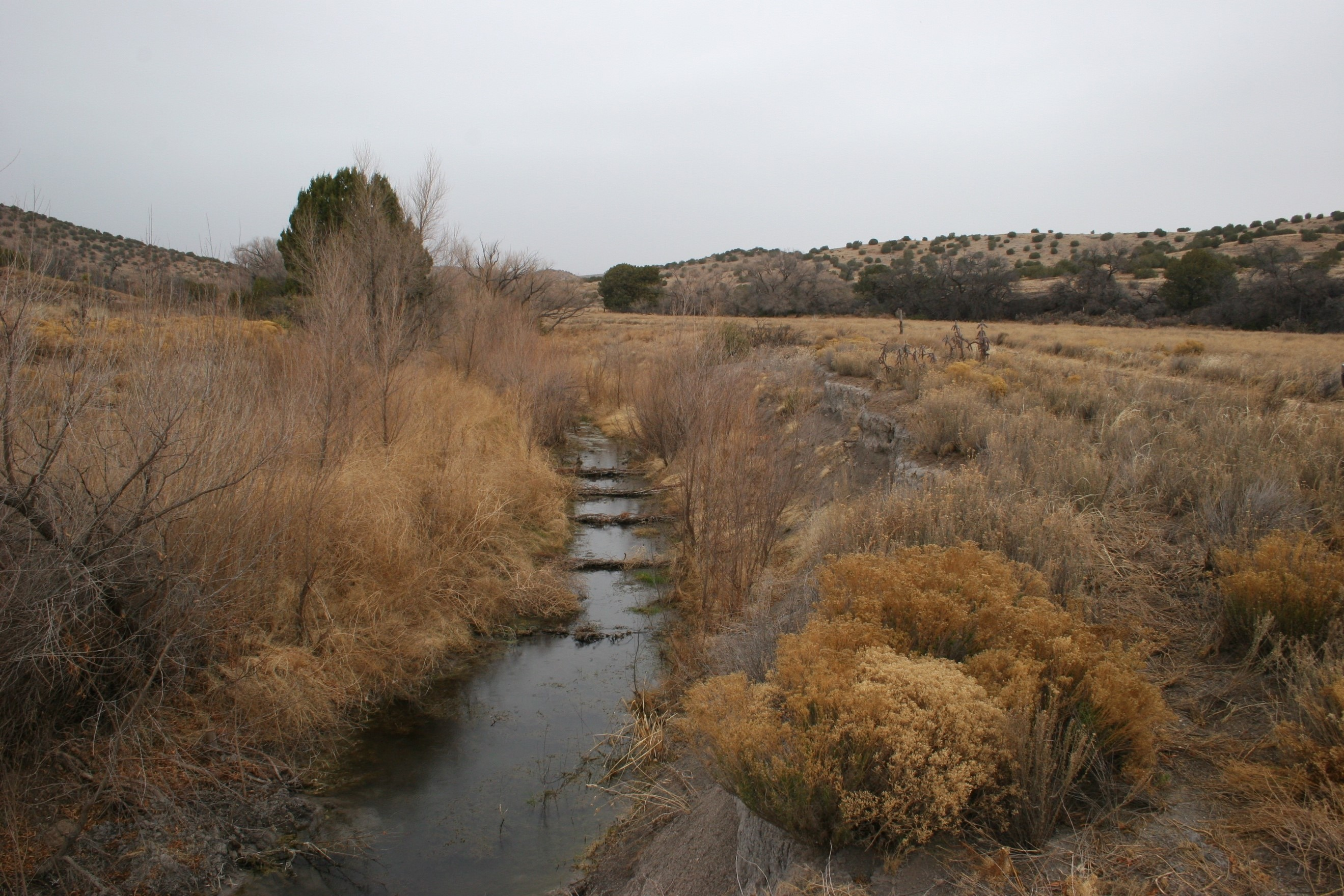
Burro Ciénega (2006) down channel about a quarter mile from the previous photograph. This section is shown more severely incised and creek-like: narrow rather than wide enough to cover the entire valley floor, but historically reaching the toes of the canyon on both sides. This ciénega has since been laboriously restored.

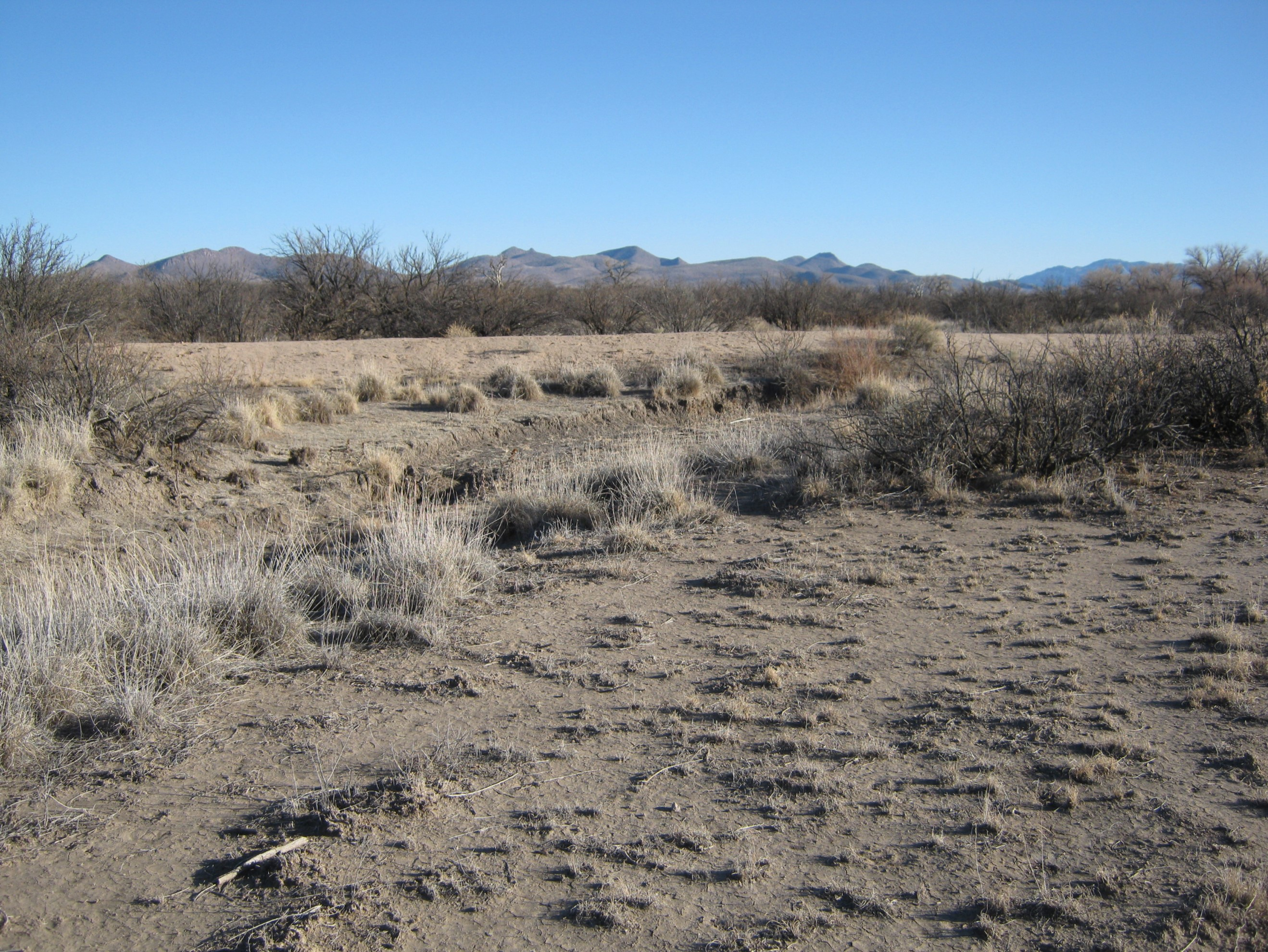
Former San Simon Ciénega on the Arizona–New Mexico border. Now dead, this ciénega is beyond any possible recovery due to a serious water overdraft, despite a determined, long-term government effort. (2010)

== Properties ==
Ciénegas are characterized by saturated, reducing soils with reliable water supply via seepage. Sedges, rushes, and grasses are the dominant plants, with a few trees that can withstand saturated soils, such as willows. Ciénegas trap organic matter from their surroundings, and are thus highly productive ecosystems.

The structure of a natural ciénega is influenced by long-term climatic cycles of wet and dry periods. During dry periods, falling water tables lead to a reduction in vegetation. Prolonged wet periods lead to increased vegetation and trapping of sediment, while brief periods of high rainfall may lead to carving of gullies. Runaway gully growth, as can occur when vegetation is artificially removed (e.g., by overgrazing), can lead to channelization and loss of the ciénega.

== Importance and conservation ==
As a primary source of water in arid environments, ciénegas support a broad range of terrestrial life, including numerous endangered species. For instance, in Arizona, 19% of threatened, endangered, or candidate threatened or endangered species are directly associated with ciénegas. Ciénegas also purify surface water and mitigate flooding when heavy precipitation occurs, and help to cycle nutrients between water and soil. Humans have also long relied on the water provided by ciénegas: Indigenous Americans used ciénegas for water and hunting grounds, and a majority of pre-historic agricultural settlements occurred in the vicinity of ciénegas. Indigenous inhabitants of the American Southwest also gave spiritual significance to ciénegas and local watering holes.

The decline of ciénegas has been caused largely by changes in land use, primarily overgrazing (which removes water-absorbing vegetation) and overexploitation of ground water for agriculture and urban use. Direct removal of vegetation from the vicinity of wetlands has also been a cause of ciénega loss, as has the extirpation of beaver from the region. Preservation of existing ciénegas, and restoration of degraded ciénegas, depends on reversing these trends in land use and preventing their recurrence in the vicinity of ciénegas. This preservation is complicated by the fact that a majority of ciénegas are found on privately owned land, most of which do not have binding conservation agreements or easements in place.

== Occurrence ==
It is likely that there were many hundreds of long-lost ciénegas, although there are only 155 identified or named ciénegas since European arrival in the International Four Corners Region of the Southwest—that is, Arizona and New Mexico in the United States and Chihuahua and Sonora in Mexico. The tables below (with minor updates) summarize the distribution and status of ciénegas in the indicated U.S. and Mexican states.

Table 1. Distribution of known ciénegas by state in the US and Mexico
Location	Quantity
Arizona, US	66
New Mexico, US	61
Sonora, MX	20
Texas, US	4
Chihuahua, MX	3
Coahuila, MX	1
Total	155

Table 2. Condition of known ciénegas as of 2015
Condition	Quantity	Percent of total
Functional	40	26%
Restorable	28	18%
Severely damaged	18	12%
Dead	69	44%
Total	155	100%

In late 2018, as part of his effort to create a wetland action plan for the state of New Mexico, retired former New Mexico botanist Robert Sivinski discovered via satellite an additional 119 small ciénegas in New Mexico. This surprising number of previously unidentified or unstudied ciénegas suggests there may be more to be found. Further site-specific status assessment information and general information about ciénegas may be found in an open bibliography of ciénega literature.

== See also ==
- Dry lake – Area that contained a standing surface water body
- Grass valley – Meadow within a forested and relatively small drainage basin
- La Cienega, New Mexico
- Oasis – Fertile area in a desert environment
- Salt pan (geology) – Flat expanse of ground covered with salt and other minerals
