= Steins Peak =

Mountain in New Mexico, United States

- Location within New Mexico

Highest point
- Elevation: 5,864 ft (1,787 m) NAVD 88
- Prominence: 1,061 ft (323 m)
- Coordinates: 32°20′01″N 109°02′37″W

Geography
- Location: Hidalgo County, New Mexico, U.S.
- Parent range: Peloncillo Mountains

Steins Peak is a 5,864-foot-high (1,787 m) mountain in Hidalgo County, New Mexico. It lies south of the upper reach of Doubtful Canyon. It is located 0.3 miles (0.5 km) east of the Arizona, New Mexico State line and 8 miles (13 km) north northwest of Steins, New Mexico.

== History ==
The peak was named for U. S. Army Major Enoch Steen (1800–1880) who led troops and an expedition in the area in 1849 and the early 1850s. It was a landmark for travelers that indicated the Doubtful Canyon pass through the Peloncillo Mountains along the Butterfield Overland Mail where it built its Steins Peak Station to the north of the mountain along Doubtful Canyon.
