= Doubtful Canyon =

Part of the Peloncillo Mountains, Arizona and New Mexico

- Location within Arizona
- Length: 9.2 mi (14.8 km) E-W

Geography
- Country: United States
- State: Arizona, New Mexico
- Region: Peloncillo Mountains
- County: Cochise County, Arizona; Hidalgo County, New Mexico
- Coordinates: 32°21′05″N 109°05′14″W
- Interactive map of Doubtful Canyon

Doubtful Canyon was the name of two canyons in the Peloncillo Mountains, once considered in the 19th century as one canyon that served as the pass through those mountains.

Today the canyon bearing the name Doubtful Canyon, is mostly in Cochise County, Arizona, near the New Mexico border. It descends to the east into the Animas Valley past Steins Peak it is in Hidalgo County, New Mexico.

Doubtful Canyon has a tributary, Little Doubtful Canyon that joins it just east of the Arizona New Mexico border. The western canyon is now called West Doubtful Canyon and it descends into the San Simon Valley, in Cochise County, Arizona.

== History ==
The mountain water sources and the low north south divide that lay between the two Doubtful canyons made it a favored shortcut for early east west travelers to the Southern Emigrant Trail wagon road which ran further south before turning west.

Doubtful Canyon and West Doubtful Canyon formed the pass where the Butterfield Overland Mail passed through the Peloncillo Mountains. Later near Steins Peak, the Steins Peak Station of the Butterfield Overland Mail was located in Doubtful Canyon.

Steins Peak Station was destroyed and its keepers killed by the Apache in 1861. On May 4, 1864, soldiers of California Column fought a band of Apache in the Skirmish in Doubtful Canyon, in the canyon near Steins Peak.
