= James H. Whitlock =

American politician

James Henry Whitlock (May 15, 1829–July 11, 1901) served in the California legislature. He served in the US Army during the American Civil War.
