= San Simon Valley =

Landform in Cochise and Graham Counties, Arizona

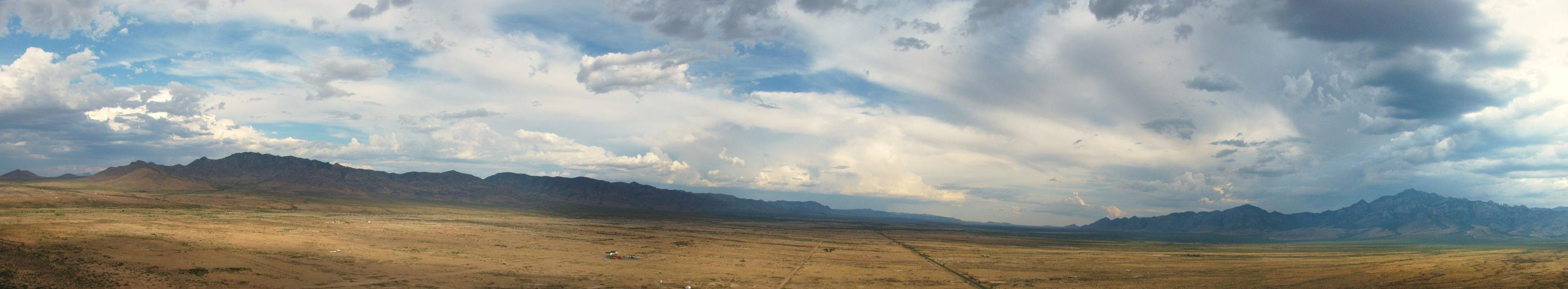
- Length: 65 mi (105 km)
- Width: 20 mi (32 km)

Geography
- Location: New Mexico/Arizona
- Borders on: San Simon, AZ–Peloncillo Mountains-NE; Dos Cabezas Mtns–Chiricahua Mtns-W & SW; Bowie, Arizona-NW; Road Forks, NM–Lordsburg-E; Rodeo, NM-S
- Coordinates: 32°48′06″N 109°37′58″W
- Interactive map of San Simon Valley

The San Simon Valley is a broad valley east of the Chiricahua Mountains, in the northeast corner of Cochise County, Arizona and southeastern Graham County, with a small portion near Antelope Pass in Hidalgo County of southwestern New Mexico. The valley trends generally north–south but in its northern portion trends northwest–southeast. The San Simon Valley separates the Chiricahua Mountains, Dos Cabezas Mountains and Pinaleno Mountains on the west from the Peloncillo Mountains and the smaller Whitlock Mountains to the east.

== Geography ==
The foot of the valley is at the northern end where the ephemeral San Simon River, that flows northwest through the valley to Safford in Graham County, enters the Gila River. At its southern end the valley merges into the separate San Bernardino Valley which trends southwest–northeast. The head of the valley, 31°39′36″N 109°16′59″W, is at the junction of the two valleys, along the divide between the south side of Rustler Canyon Creek watershed and Paramore Crater just south of the town of Apache.

Interstate 10 crosses the valley east–west. U.S. Route 191, runs north from I-10 to Safford. The White Mountains lie north of the northern end of the valley.

== Culture ==
The San Simon Valley is noted for the ceramics of native American Indians called the Roosevelt Red Ware, one type being named for a site in the valley, the Nine Mile Polychrome.
