= Peloncillo Mountains (Cochise County) =

Mountain range in Arizona, US

- Little Baldy
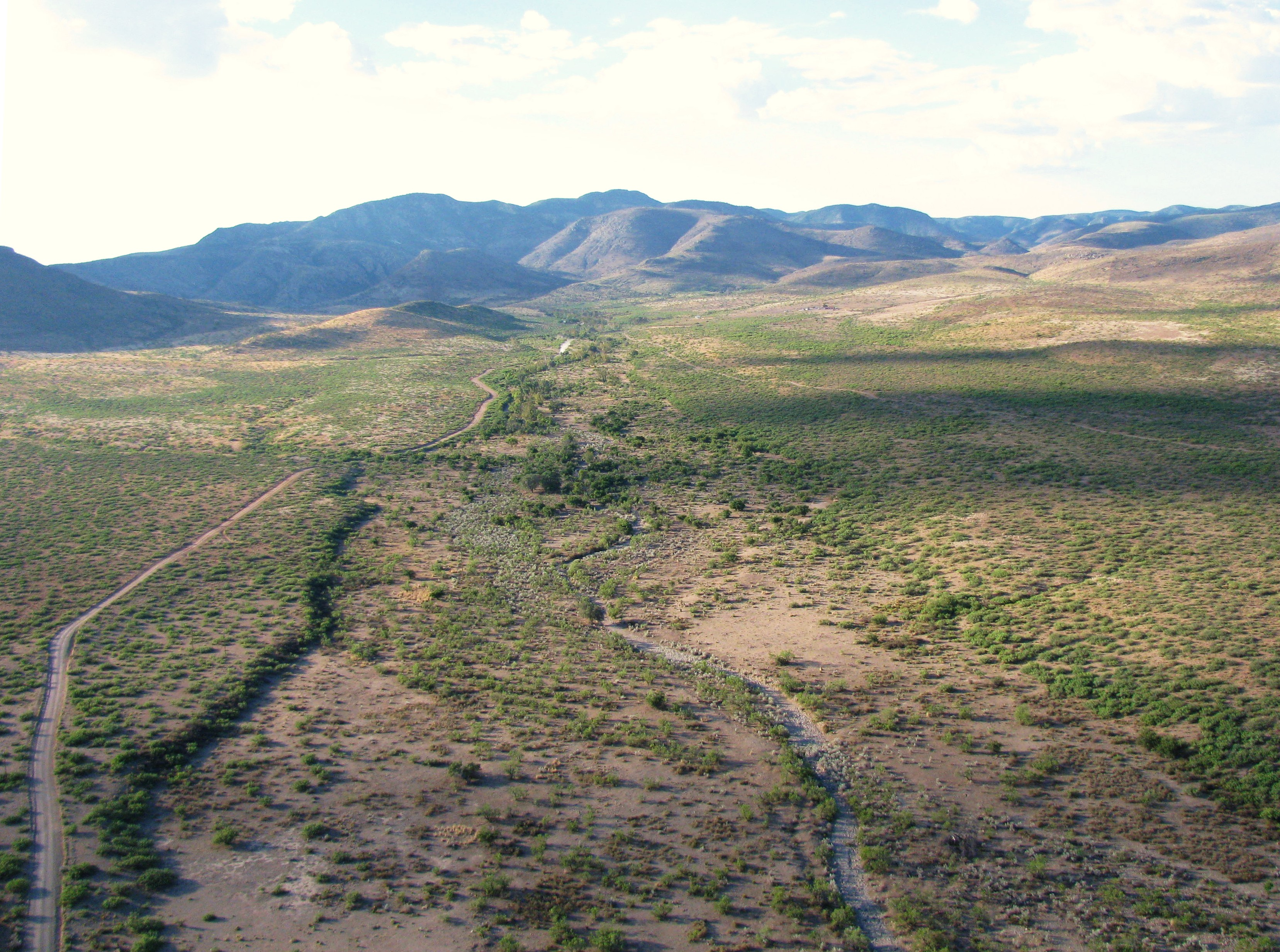
- View of the Peloncillos and the entrance of Skeleton Canyon, facing east

Highest point
- Peak: Midway Peak (Arizona)
- Elevation: 5,551 ft (1,692 m)
- Coordinates: 32°24′11″N 109°08′42″W

Dimensions
- Length: 35 mi (56 km)
- Width: 10 mi (16 km)

Geography
- Location within Arizona
- Country: United States
- State: Arizona
- Region: Sonoran Desert
- Counties: Cochise, Graham and Greenlee
- Settlements: San Simon, Duncan and Franklin
- Range coordinates: 32°24′11″N 109°08′42″W
- Borders on: Gila River, U.S. Route 70, Whitlock Valley and San Simon Valley

The Peloncillo Mountains of Cochise County (Spanish: pelo, hair, pelon, hairless, bald; peloncillo, Little Baldy) is a mountain range in northeast Cochise County, Arizona. A northern north–south stretch of the range extends to the southern region of Greenlee County on the northeast, and a southeast region of Graham County on the northwest. The north stretch of the Peloncillos forms the border between the two counties. It lies east and northeast of the Willcox Playa, and the San Simon Valley.

The range lies in a region of southeast Arizona and southwest New Mexico called the Madrean Sky Islands.

== Description ==
The Peloncillo Mountains of Cochise County are a 35 mi (56 km) long range. The north section is oriented north–south, and is bordered on the north by the Gila River which flows west-northwesterly from western New Mexico. The Whitlock Valley and Whitlock Mountains border to the west.

The southern section of the range is a northwest by southeast region, and contains the Peloncillo Mountains Wilderness. The highest point of the range is Midway Peak, 5,551 ft (1,692 m), at 32.40313°N 109.14506°W. Midway Peak is just west of the northern part of the wilderness and is surrounded by it: center-north, northeast, east, and southeast. For the southern part of the wilderness, Gold Hill is just west with an access route through the canyon between; south of the wilderness lies Roostercomb.

Other peaks in the southern region of the Peloncillo Mountains from north to south are, Mount Rayburne, 4,680 ft (1,426 m), Winchester Peak, 5,127 ft (1,563 m), San Simon Peak, 5,325 ft (1,623 m), Engine Mountain, Gold Hill, and Roostercomb.

== See also ==
- List of Madrean Sky Island mountain ranges - Sonoran - Chihuahuan Deserts
- List of mountain ranges of Arizona
- Malpai Borderlands
