= List of Hyperaspis species =

This is a list of species in the genus Hyperaspis.

== Hyperaspis species ==
- Hyperaspis abertha Gordon & Canepari, 2008
- Hyperaspis abscondita González & Gordon, 2009
- Hyperaspis aemulata Gordon & Canepari, 2008
- Hyperaspis aemulator Casey, 1908
- Hyperaspis albicollis Gorham, 1894
- Hyperaspis albopunctata Crotch, 1874
- Hyperaspis amati González, 2024
- Hyperaspis andina González & Gordon, 2009
- Hyperaspis annexa LeConte, 1852
- Hyperaspis apicaspis Gordon & Canepari, 2008
- Hyperaspis arida Gordon & Canepari, 2008
- Hyperaspis arizonica Dobzhansky, 1941
- Hyperaspis atra Gordon & Canepari, 2008
- Hyperaspis ayacucho Gordon & Canepari, 2008
- Hyperaspis bensonica Casey, 1908
- Hyperaspis bicruciata Mulsant, 1850
- Hyperaspis bigeminata (Randall, 1838) (bigeminy lady beetle)
- Hyperaspis biguttata (Sicard, 1912)
- Hyperaspis binaria Casey, 1924
- Hyperaspis binotata (Say, 1826)
- Hyperaspis bisignata Gordon & Canepari, 2008
- Hyperaspis bolteri LeConte, 1880
- Hyperaspis borealis Dobzhansky, 1941
- Hyperaspis brethesi Gordon & Canepari, 2008
- Hyperaspis brunnescens Dobzhansky, 1941
- Hyperaspis camargoi Gordon & Canepari, 2008
- Hyperaspis campbelli Gordon & Canepari, 2008
- Hyperaspis caseyi Gordon, 1985
- Hyperaspis chapini Dobzhansky, 1941 (Chapin's sigil lady beetle)
- Hyperaspis chapini Gordon & Canepari, 2008
- Hyperaspis chocoi Gordon & Canepari, 2008
- Hyperaspis cincta LeConte, 1858
- Hyperaspis circumclusa Gordon & Canepari, 2008
- Hyperaspis cleida Mulsant, 1850
- Hyperaspis c-nigrum Mulsant, 1850
- Hyperaspis colombiensis Gordon & Canepari, 2008
- Hyperaspis concavus Watson, 1969
- Hyperaspis conclusa Weise, 1904
- Hyperaspis connectens (Thunberg, 1808) (connected lady)
- Hyperaspis consimilis LeConte, 1852
- Hyperaspis conspirans Casey, 1908
- Hyperaspis conviva Casey, 1924
- Hyperaspis corcovado Gordon & González, 2011
- Hyperaspis cracentis Gordon & Canepari, 2008
- Hyperaspis cruenta LeConte, 1880 (bloody lady beetle)
- Hyperaspis delicata Almeida & Vitorino, 1997
- Hyperaspis deludens Gordon, 1985
- Hyperaspis disconotata Mulsant, 1850 (disk-marked lady beetle)
- Hyperaspis dispar Gordon & Canepari, 2008
- Hyperaspis disrupta Dobzhansky, 1941
- Hyperaspis dissidens Gordon & Canepari, 2008
- Hyperaspis dissoluta Crotch, 1873 (dissolute lady beetle)
- Hyperaspis divaricata Gordon & González, 2011
- Hyperaspis dobzhanskyi Gordon, 1985 (Dobzhansky's lady beetle)
- Hyperaspis donzeli (Mulsant, 1850)
- Hyperaspis drechseli Gordon & González, 2011
- Hyperaspis elegantissima Brèthes, 1925
- Hyperaspis esclavium Dobzhansky, 1941
- Hyperaspis esmeraldas Gordon & González, 2011
- Hyperaspis eupaleoides Crotch, 1874
- Hyperaspis excelsa Fall, 1901
- Hyperaspis fastidiosa Casey, 1908 (fastidious lady beetle)
- Hyperaspis festiva Mulsant, 1850
- Hyperaspis filiola Casey, 1908
- Hyperaspis fimbriolata Melsheimer, 1847
- Hyperaspis funesta (Germain, 1854)
- Hyperaspis gemina LeConte, 1880 (twin-spotted lady beetle)
- Hyperaspis gemma Casey, 1899
- Hyperaspis germainii Crotch, 1874
- Hyperaspis globula Casey, 1899 (globular lady beetle)
- Hyperaspis guilloryi (Mulsant, 1850)
- Hyperaspis haematosticta Fall, 1907
- Hyperaspis helveola Gordon & Canepari, 2008
- Hyperaspis herrerai Gordon & Canepari, 2008
- Hyperaspis histrionica (Mulsant, 1850)
- Hyperaspis howdeni Gordon & Canepari, 2008
- Hyperaspis humboldti Gordon & González, 2011
- Hyperaspis imitator Gordon, 1985
- Hyperaspis imitatrix Gordon & Canepari, 2008
- Hyperaspis immaculata Hatch, 1961
- Hyperaspis inedita Mulsant, 1850
- Hyperaspis inflexa Casey, 1899 (curved lady beetle)
- Hyperaspis ingrata (Mulsant, 1850)
- Hyperaspis istmina Gordon & Canepari, 2008
- Hyperaspis jasperensis Belicek, 1976
- Hyperaspis joannae Gordon & Canepari, 2008
- Hyperaspis jocosa (Mulsant, 1850)
- Hyperaspis jovialis Fall, 1925
- Hyperaspis lanatii González & Gordon, 2009
- Hyperaspis lateralis Mulsant, 1850 (lateral lady beetle)
- Hyperaspis laterimacula Gordon & Canepari, 2008
- Hyperaspis latitibia Gordon & Canepari, 2008
- Hyperaspis leachi Nunenmacher, 1934
- Hyperaspis levrati (Mulsant, 1850) (Levrat's lady beetle)
- Hyperaspis lewisii Crotch, 1873
- Hyperaspis limbalis Casey, 1899
- Hyperaspis limbigera (Mulsant, 1853)
- Hyperaspis lindae Gordon & Canepari, 2008
- Hyperaspis longula Weise, 1922
- Hyperaspis luciae Gordon & González, 2011
- Hyperaspis lugubris (Randall, 1838) (lugubrius lady beetle)
- Hyperaspis major Dobzhansky, 1941
- Hyperaspis mariposa Gordon & Canepari, 2008
- Hyperaspis matronata (Mulsant, 1853)
- Hyperaspis mckenziei Nutting, 1980
- Hyperaspis medialis Casey, 1899 (medial lady beetle)
- Hyperaspis mimica Gordon & Canepari, 2008
- Hyperaspis moerens (LeConte, 1850)
- Hyperaspis nana Mader, 1957
- Hyperaspis nigrosuturalis Blatchley, 1918
- Hyperaspis nunenmacheri Casey, 1908
- Hyperaspis octavia Casey, 1908
- Hyperaspis octonotata Casey, 1899 (eight-spotted lady beetle)
- Hyperaspis octomaculata González, 2024
- Hyperaspis oculaticauda Casey, 1899 (eye-tailed lady beetle)
- Hyperaspis oculifera Casey, 1908
- Hyperaspis onerata (Mulsant, 1850)
- Hyperaspis operaria (Mulsant, 1853)
- Hyperaspis oregona Dobzhansky, 1941
- Hyperaspis ornatella Gordon, 1985
- Hyperaspis orthivora Gordon & Canepari, 2008
- Hyperaspis osculans Leconte, 1880
- Hyperaspis paludicola Schwarz, 1878 (swamp lady beetle)
- Hyperaspis pectoralis Crotch, 1874
- Hyperaspis pentaseparata González, 2015
- Hyperaspis pinguis Casey, 1899
- Hyperaspis pistillata Watson, 1969
- Hyperaspis pleuralis Casey, 1899
- Hyperaspis pluto Fall, 1925
- Hyperaspis postica Leconte, 1880 (postica lady beetle)
- Hyperaspis praecipua Gordon & González, 2011
- Hyperaspis pratensis LeConte, 1852
- Hyperaspis prolata Gordon & Canepari, 2008
- Hyperaspis proba (Say, 1826) (esteemed lady beetle)
- Hyperaspis protensa Casey, 1908
- Hyperaspis pseudodonzeli Gordon & Canepari, 2008
- Hyperaspis pseudopavida Gordon & Canepari, 2008
- Hyperaspis psyche Casey, 1899
- Hyperaspis punctata LeConte, 1880
- Hyperaspis quadrioculata (Motschulsky, 1845) (four-eyed lady beetle)
- Hyperaspis quadrivittata LeConte, 1852 (four-streaked lady beetle)
- Hyperaspis querquesi Nutting, 1980
- Hyperaspis recordata Mulsant, 1850
- Hyperaspis revocans Casey, 1908
- Hyperaspis rivularis Dobzhansky, 1941
- Hyperaspis rotunda Casey, 1899
- Hyperaspis rutai Szawaryn & Czerwiński, 2022
- Hyperaspis sagittata Crotch, 1874
- Hyperaspis satipoensis Gordon & Canepari, 2008
- Hyperaspis schaefferi Gordon, 1985 (Schaeffer's lady beetle)
- Hyperaspis scutifera (Mulsant, 1850)
- Hyperaspis senegalensis Mulsant, 1850
- Hyperaspis sexverrucata (Fabricius, 1801)
- Hyperaspis signata (Olivier, 1808)
- Hyperaspis significans Casey, 1908
- Hyperaspis siladesma Gordon & Canepari, 2008
- Hyperaspis silvestrii Weise, 1909
- Hyperaspis simlaensis Gordon & Canepari, 2008
- Hyperaspis simulans Casey, 1899
- Hyperaspis simulatrix Dobzhansky, 1941
- Hyperaspis spiculinota Fall, 1901
- Hyperaspis siladesma Gordon & Canepari, 2008
- Hyperaspis sphaeridioides Mulsant, 1850
- Hyperaspis syriaca Weise, 1885
- Hyperaspis taeniata LeConte, 1852 (ribboned lady beetle)
- Hyperaspis tayronensis Gordon & Canepari, 2008
- Hyperaspis transversoguttata Weise, 1878
- Hyperaspis triangulum Casey, 1899 (triad lady beetle)
- Hyperaspis trifurcata Schaeffer, 1905 (trident lady beetle)
- Hyperaspis troglodytes Mulsant, 1853 (troglodyte lady beetle)
- Hyperaspis tuckeri Casey, 1924
- Hyperaspis undulata (Say, 1824) (undulate lady beetle)
- Hyperaspis uniformis Casey, 1924
- Hyperaspis unimaculosa Gordon & González, 2011
- Hyperaspis uninotata Gordon & Canepari, 2008
- Hyperaspis uteana Gordon, 1985
- Hyperaspis vredenburgi Gordon & Canepari, 2008
- Hyperaspis weisei Schaeffer, 1908 (Weise's lady beetle)
- Hyperaspis wickhami Casey, 1899 (Wickham's lady beetle)
- Hyperaspis zonula Gordon & Canepari, 2008
