= Hyperaspis syriaca =

Scientific classification
- Kingdom: Animalia
- Phylum: Arthropoda
- Clade: Pancrustacea
- Class: Insecta
- Order: Coleoptera
- Suborder: Polyphaga
- Infraorder: Cucujiformia
- Family: Coccinellidae
- Genus: Hyperaspis
- Species: H. syriaca

Binomial name
- Hyperaspis syriaca Weise, 1885

Species of beetle

Hyperaspis syriaca is a species of lady beetle. It occurs in Turkey, Iran and possibly neighboring areas, as well as on some islands of the Aegean.

== See also ==
- List of Hyperaspis species
