= Hyperaspis disrupta =

Scientific classification
- Kingdom: Animalia
- Phylum: Arthropoda
- Clade: Pancrustacea
- Class: Insecta
- Order: Coleoptera
- Suborder: Polyphaga
- Infraorder: Cucujiformia
- Family: Coccinellidae
- Genus: Hyperaspis
- Species: H. disrupta

Binomial name
- Hyperaspis disrupta Dobzhansky, 1941

Synonyms
- Hyperaspis bensonica disrupta Dobzhansky, 1941

Species of beetle

Hyperaspis disrupta is a species of lady beetle in the family Coccinellidae. It is found in North America, where it has been recorded from Arizona, California, New Mexico and Colorado.

== Description ==
Adults reach a length of about 1.60-1.80 mm. The anterior and lateral border of the pronotum of the males is yellow. The elytron has a discal and apical spot.
