= Hyperaspis limbigera =

Scientific classification
- Kingdom: Animalia
- Phylum: Arthropoda
- Clade: Pancrustacea
- Class: Insecta
- Order: Coleoptera
- Suborder: Polyphaga
- Infraorder: Cucujiformia
- Family: Coccinellidae
- Genus: Hyperaspis
- Species: H. limbigera

Binomial name
- Hyperaspis limbigera (Mulsant, 1853)

Synonyms
- Cleothera limbigera Mulsant, 1853

Species of beetle

Hyperaspis limbigera is a species of beetle of the family Coccinellidae. It is found in Brazil.

== Description ==
Adults reach a length of about 2.8 mm. They have a yellow body. The pronotum has two large dark brown triangular spots and a small light brown oblong spot. The elytron has a brown border on the sutural margin, connected to a large irregular brown band.
