= Hyperaspis atra =

Scientific classification
- Kingdom: Animalia
- Phylum: Arthropoda
- Clade: Pancrustacea
- Class: Insecta
- Order: Coleoptera
- Suborder: Polyphaga
- Infraorder: Cucujiformia
- Family: Coccinellidae
- Genus: Hyperaspis
- Species: H. atra

Binomial name
- Hyperaspis atra Gordon & Canepari, 2008

Species of beetle

Hyperaspis atra is a species of beetle of the family Coccinellidae. It is found in Brazil.

== Description ==
Adults reach a length of about 1.8 mm. They have a black body and yellow head. The apical one-fifth and lateral one-sixth of the pronotum are yellow. The elytron has one small yellow spot.

== Etymology ==
The species name is derived from Latin atra (meaning black) and refers to the mostly black dorsum.
