= Hyperaspis mckenziei =

Scientific classification
- Kingdom: Animalia
- Phylum: Arthropoda
- Clade: Pancrustacea
- Class: Insecta
- Order: Coleoptera
- Suborder: Polyphaga
- Infraorder: Cucujiformia
- Family: Coccinellidae
- Genus: Hyperaspis
- Species: H. mckenziei

Binomial name
- Hyperaspis mckenziei Nutting, 1980

Species of beetle

Hyperaspis mckenziei is a species of beetle of the family Coccinellidae. It is found in North America, where it has been recorded from California.

== Description ==
Adults reach a length of about 2.20 mm. The pronotum of the males is yellow laterally, while the pronotum of the females is yellow. The elytron has a large discal spot and a small apical spot.
