= Hyperaspis apicaspis =

Scientific classification
- Kingdom: Animalia
- Phylum: Arthropoda
- Clade: Pancrustacea
- Class: Insecta
- Order: Coleoptera
- Suborder: Polyphaga
- Infraorder: Cucujiformia
- Family: Coccinellidae
- Genus: Hyperaspis
- Species: H. apicaspis

Binomial name
- Hyperaspis apicaspis Gordon & Canepari, 2008

Species of beetle

Hyperaspis apicaspis is a species of beetle of the family Coccinellidae. It is found in Brazil.

== Description ==
Adults reach a length of about 2 mm. They have a black body and yellow head. The lateral one-fourth of the pronotum is yellow. The elytron has one round spot at the apex.

== Etymology ==
The species name is a combination of Latin apiculus (meaning apex or apical) and -aspis (the ending of the genus name Hyperaspis).
