= Hyperaspis bicruciata =

Scientific classification
- Kingdom: Animalia
- Phylum: Arthropoda
- Clade: Pancrustacea
- Class: Insecta
- Order: Coleoptera
- Suborder: Polyphaga
- Infraorder: Cucujiformia
- Family: Coccinellidae
- Genus: Hyperaspis
- Species: H. bicruciata

Binomial name
- Hyperaspis bicruciata Mulsant, 1850

Species of beetle

Hyperaspis bicruciata is a species of beetle of the family Coccinellidae. It is found in northern South America.

== Description ==
Adults reach a length of about 2.4 mm. They have a black body and yellow head. The pronotum is yellow with a brown spot. The elytron has three yellow spots.
