= Hyperaspis latitibia =

Scientific classification
- Kingdom: Animalia
- Phylum: Arthropoda
- Clade: Pancrustacea
- Class: Insecta
- Order: Coleoptera
- Suborder: Polyphaga
- Infraorder: Cucujiformia
- Family: Coccinellidae
- Genus: Hyperaspis
- Species: H. latitibia

Binomial name
- Hyperaspis latitibia Gordon & Canepari, 2008

Species of beetle

Hyperaspis latitibia is a species of beetle of the family Coccinellidae. It is found in Bolivia.

== Description ==
Adults reach a length of about 3.6 mm. They have a black body and a yellow head. The pronotum is yellow with a large spot. The elytron has two large yellow spots.

== Etymology ==
The species name is derived from Latin latus (meaning broad) and tibia and refers to the flanged protibia.
