= Hyperaspis satipoensis =

Scientific classification
- Kingdom: Animalia
- Phylum: Arthropoda
- Clade: Pancrustacea
- Class: Insecta
- Order: Coleoptera
- Suborder: Polyphaga
- Infraorder: Cucujiformia
- Family: Coccinellidae
- Genus: Hyperaspis
- Species: H. satipoensis

Binomial name
- Hyperaspis satipoensis Gordon & Canepari, 2008

Species of beetle

Hyperaspis satipoensis is a species of beetle of the family Coccinellidae. It is found in Peru.

== Description ==
Adults reach a length of about 3 mm. They have a black body and yellow head. The pronotum is yellow with a basomedian black spot. The lateral one-fourth of the pronotum is also yellow. The elytron has three yellow spots.

== Etymology ==
The species is named for Satipo, Peru, the holotype locality.
