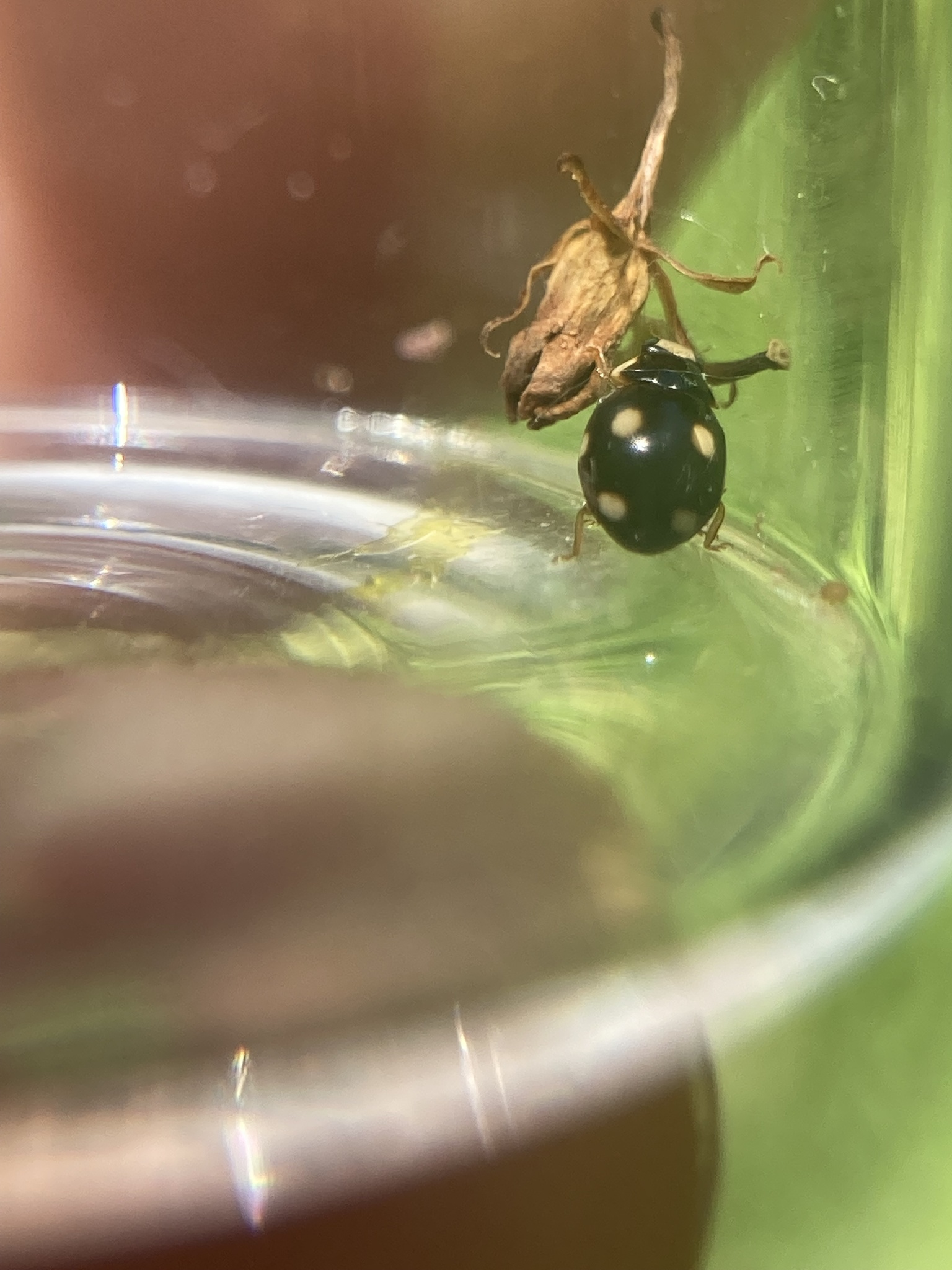

Scientific classification
- Kingdom: Animalia
- Phylum: Arthropoda
- Clade: Pancrustacea
- Class: Insecta
- Order: Coleoptera
- Suborder: Polyphaga
- Infraorder: Cucujiformia
- Family: Coccinellidae
- Genus: Hyperaspis
- Species: H. deludens

Binomial name
- Hyperaspis deludens Gordon, 1985

= Hyperaspis deludens =

Species of beetle

Hyperaspis deludens is a species of lady beetle in the family Coccinellidae. It is found in North America, where it has been recorded from Illinois and Ohio.

== Description ==
Adults reach a length of about 2.60 mm. They have a black head and the pronotum is black with a large yellow area on the lateral margin. The elytron is black with three yellow spots.
