= Hyperaspis howdeni =

Scientific classification
- Kingdom: Animalia
- Phylum: Arthropoda
- Clade: Pancrustacea
- Class: Insecta
- Order: Coleoptera
- Suborder: Polyphaga
- Infraorder: Cucujiformia
- Family: Coccinellidae
- Genus: Hyperaspis
- Species: H. howdeni

Binomial name
- Hyperaspis howdeni Gordon & Canepari, 2008

Species of beetle

Hyperaspis howdeni is a species of beetle of the family Coccinellidae. It is found in Colombia.

== Description ==
Adults reach a length of about 2.1 mm. They have a black body and yellow head. The pronotum is yellow with a large black spot. The elytron has a large discal spot.

== Etymology ==
The species is named for Henry Howden, one of the type collectors, and entomological colleague of the authors.
