= Hyperaspis sagittata =

Scientific classification
- Kingdom: Animalia
- Phylum: Arthropoda
- Clade: Pancrustacea
- Class: Insecta
- Order: Coleoptera
- Suborder: Polyphaga
- Infraorder: Cucujiformia
- Family: Coccinellidae
- Genus: Hyperaspis
- Species: H. sagittata

Binomial name
- Hyperaspis sagittata Crotch, 1874

Species of beetle

Hyperaspis sagittata is a species of beetle of the family Coccinellidae. It is found in Colombia.

== Description ==
Adults reach a length of about 2.6 mm. They have a yellow body. The pronotum has four triangular brown spots. The elytron has dark brown margins and four brown spots.
