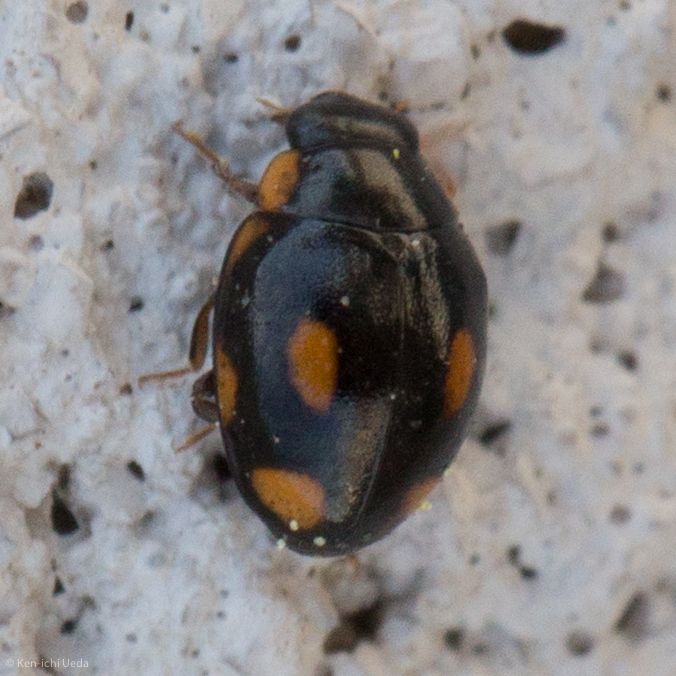

Scientific classification
- Kingdom: Animalia
- Phylum: Arthropoda
- Clade: Pancrustacea
- Class: Insecta
- Order: Coleoptera
- Suborder: Polyphaga
- Infraorder: Cucujiformia
- Family: Coccinellidae
- Genus: Hyperaspis
- Species: H. quadrioculata

Binomial name
- Hyperaspis quadrioculata (Motschulsky, 1845)

Synonyms
- Exochomus quadrioculatus Motschulsky, 1845; Hyperaspis notatula Casey, 1899; Hyperaspis fidelis Casey, 1908; Hyperaspis quadrioculata scotti Dobzhansky, 1941

= Hyperaspis quadrioculata =

Species of beetle

Hyperaspis quadrioculata, the four-eyed lady beetle, is a species of lady beetle in the family Coccinellidae. It is found in North America, where it has been recorded from central and southern California.

== Description ==
Adults reach a length of about 2.70-4.0 mm. The elytron has a variable colour pattern.
