= Hyperaspis andina =

Scientific classification
- Kingdom: Animalia
- Phylum: Arthropoda
- Clade: Pancrustacea
- Class: Insecta
- Order: Coleoptera
- Suborder: Polyphaga
- Infraorder: Cucujiformia
- Family: Coccinellidae
- Genus: Hyperaspis
- Species: H. andina

Binomial name
- Hyperaspis andina González & Gordon, 2009

Species of beetle

Hyperaspis andina is a species of beetle of the family Coccinellidae. It is found in Chile.

== Description ==
Adults reach a length of about 2.1–2.5 mm. Adults are black. The lateral one-eight and anterior border of the pronotum are yellow. The elytron has a yellow lateral margin.

== Etymology ==
The species name refers to the Andean mountain chain where specimens of this species were found.
