= Hyperaspis uniformis =

Scientific classification
- Kingdom: Animalia
- Phylum: Arthropoda
- Clade: Pancrustacea
- Class: Insecta
- Order: Coleoptera
- Suborder: Polyphaga
- Infraorder: Cucujiformia
- Family: Coccinellidae
- Genus: Hyperaspis
- Species: H. uniformis

Binomial name
- Hyperaspis uniformis Casey, 1924

Species of beetle

Hyperaspis uniformis is a species of beetle in the family Coccinellidae. It is found in North America, where it has been recorded from North Carolina and Florida.

== Description ==
Adults reach a length of about 3.70 mm. The pronotum of the males is black medially, while the lateral one-fourth and the anterior border are reddish yellow. The elytron has no markings.
