= Hyperaspis recordata =

Scientific classification
- Kingdom: Animalia
- Phylum: Arthropoda
- Clade: Pancrustacea
- Class: Insecta
- Order: Coleoptera
- Suborder: Polyphaga
- Infraorder: Cucujiformia
- Family: Coccinellidae
- Genus: Hyperaspis
- Species: H. recordata

Binomial name
- Hyperaspis recordata Mulsant, 1850

Species of beetle

Hyperaspis recordata is a species of beetle of the family Coccinellidae. It is found in Brazil.

== Description ==
Adults reach a length of about 2.4–2.6 mm. They have a black body. The lateral margin and anterior margin of the pronotum are yellow. The elytron has two yellow spots.
