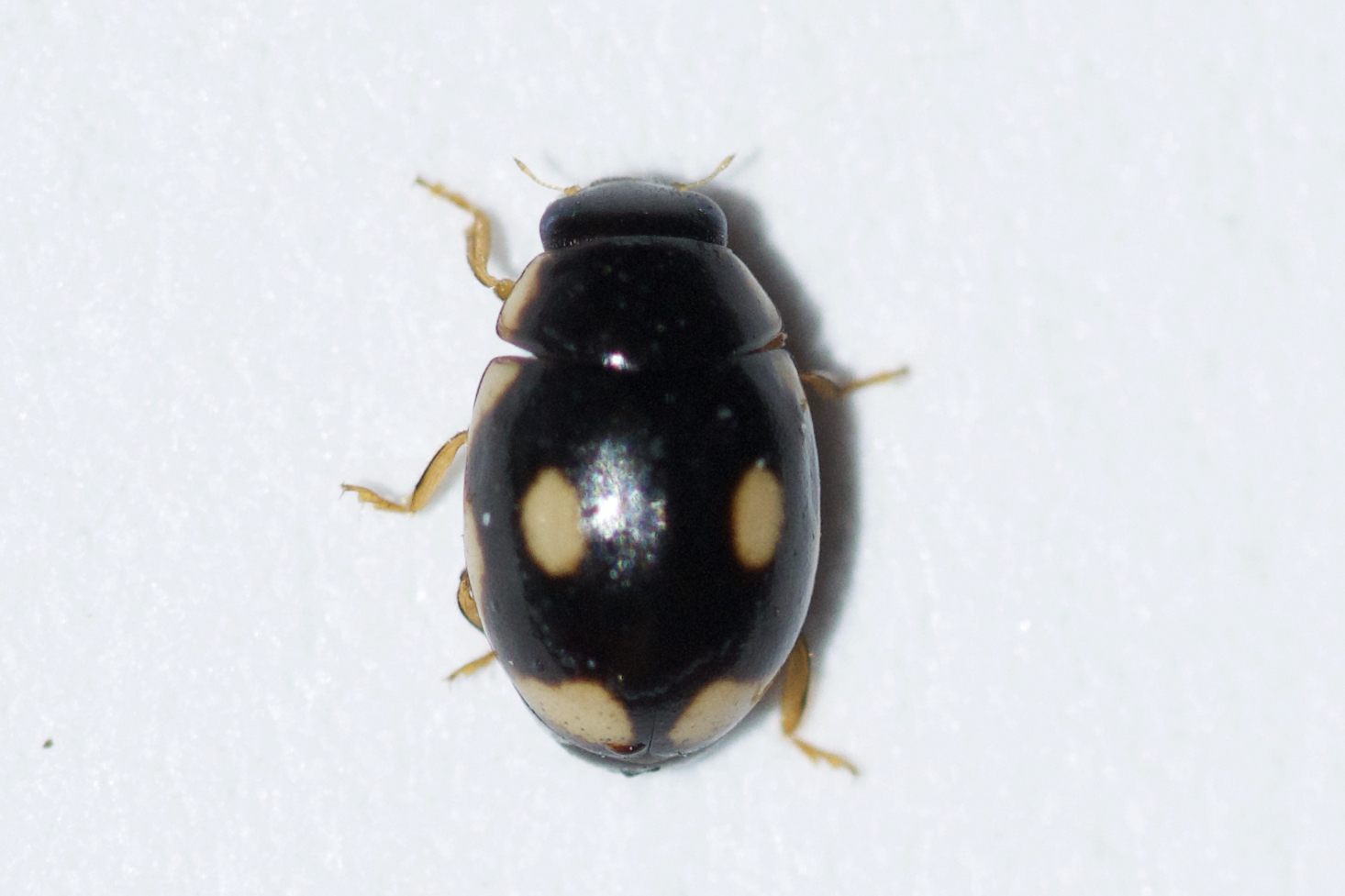

Scientific classification
- Kingdom: Animalia
- Phylum: Arthropoda
- Clade: Pancrustacea
- Class: Insecta
- Order: Coleoptera
- Suborder: Polyphaga
- Infraorder: Cucujiformia
- Family: Coccinellidae
- Genus: Hyperaspis
- Species: H. undulata

Binomial name
- Hyperaspis undulata (Say, 1824)

Synonyms
- Coccinella undulata Say, 1824; Hyperaspis maculifera Melsheimer, 1847; Hyperaspis elegans Mulsant, 1850; Hyperaspis elegans var. guttifera Weise, 1895

= Hyperaspis undulata =

Species of beetle

Hyperaspis undulata, the undulate lady beetle, is a species of lady beetle in the family Coccinellidae. It is found in North America, where it has been recorded from Alberta, British Columbia, Ontario, Connecticut, Colorado, Illinois, Indiana, Iowa, Kansas, Louisiana, Maryland, Massachusetts, Michigan, Minnesota, New Jersey, New York, North Dakota, Oregon, Pennsylvania, Tennessee, Washington and Wisconsin.

== Description ==
Adults reach a length of about 1.80-2.75 mm. The elytron is black with a lateral vitta.
