= Hyperaspis campbelli =

Scientific classification
- Kingdom: Animalia
- Phylum: Arthropoda
- Clade: Pancrustacea
- Class: Insecta
- Order: Coleoptera
- Suborder: Polyphaga
- Infraorder: Cucujiformia
- Family: Coccinellidae
- Genus: Hyperaspis
- Species: H. campbelli

Binomial name
- Hyperaspis campbelli Gordon & Canepari, 2008

Species of beetle

Hyperaspis campbelli is a species of beetle of the family Coccinellidae. It is found in Colombia.

== Description ==
Adults reach a length of about 2.4 mm. They have a yellow body. The pronotum has four median brown spots. The apical two-thirds of the elytron is reddish yellow with four brown spots.

== Etymology ==
The species is named for one of the collectors of the type specimen.
