= Hyperaspis histrionica =

Scientific classification
- Kingdom: Animalia
- Phylum: Arthropoda
- Clade: Pancrustacea
- Class: Insecta
- Order: Coleoptera
- Suborder: Polyphaga
- Infraorder: Cucujiformia
- Family: Coccinellidae
- Genus: Hyperaspis
- Species: H. histrionica

Binomial name
- Hyperaspis histrionica (Mulsant, 1850)

Synonyms
- Cleothera histrionica Mulsant, 1850

Species of beetle

Hyperaspis histrionica is a species of beetle of the family Coccinellidae. It is found in Colombia.

== Description ==
Adults reach a length of about 2.4 mm. They have a black body and dark brown head. The pronotum is dark yellow with a black border, a triangular black spot and a small black rounded spot. The elytron is black with a yellow lateral border and six yellow spots.
