= Hyperaspis pseudopavida =

Scientific classification
- Kingdom: Animalia
- Phylum: Arthropoda
- Clade: Pancrustacea
- Class: Insecta
- Order: Coleoptera
- Suborder: Polyphaga
- Infraorder: Cucujiformia
- Family: Coccinellidae
- Genus: Hyperaspis
- Species: H. pseudopavida

Binomial name
- Hyperaspis pseudopavida Gordon & Canepari, 2008

Species of beetle

Hyperaspis pseudopavida is a species of beetle of the family Coccinellidae. It is found in Brazil.

== Description ==
Adults reach a length of about 2.2 mm. They have a black body. The pronotum has four triangular brown spots. The elytron has three small yellow spots.

== Etymology ==
The species name refers to the resemblance to Cleothera pavida.
