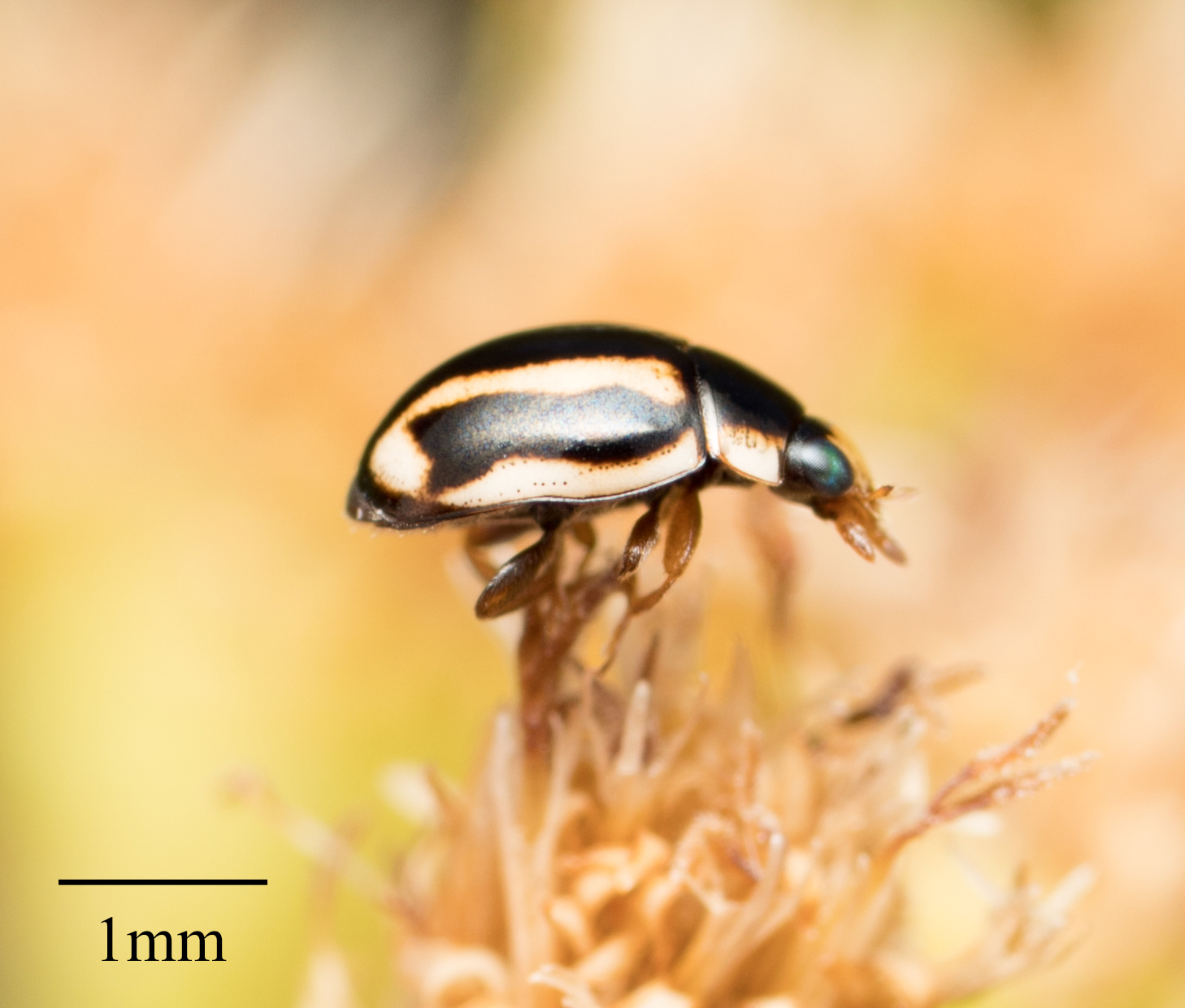

Scientific classification
- Kingdom: Animalia
- Phylum: Arthropoda
- Clade: Pancrustacea
- Class: Insecta
- Order: Coleoptera
- Suborder: Polyphaga
- Infraorder: Cucujiformia
- Family: Coccinellidae
- Genus: Hyperaspis
- Species: H. annexa

Binomial name
- Hyperaspis annexa LeConte, 1852

= Hyperaspis annexa =

Species of beetle

Hyperaspis annexa is a species of lady beetle in the family Coccinellidae. It is found in North America, where it has been recorded from California.

== Description ==
Adults reach a length of about 2.0-2.75 mm. The anterior margin of the pronotum of the males is yellow or sometimes black. The elytron is black with two yellow vittae.
