= Hyperaspis tuckeri =

Scientific classification
- Kingdom: Animalia
- Phylum: Arthropoda
- Clade: Pancrustacea
- Class: Insecta
- Order: Coleoptera
- Suborder: Polyphaga
- Infraorder: Cucujiformia
- Family: Coccinellidae
- Genus: Hyperaspis
- Species: H. tuckeri

Binomial name
- Hyperaspis tuckeri Casey, 1924

Species of beetle

Hyperaspis tuckeri is a species of lady beetle in the family Coccinellidae. It is found in North America, where it has been recorded from Arizona.

== Description ==
Adults reach a length of about 3 mm. The lateral one-fourth and apical margin of the pronotum of the males is yellow. The elytron has a red spot.
