= Hyperaspis conclusa =

Scientific classification
- Kingdom: Animalia
- Phylum: Arthropoda
- Clade: Pancrustacea
- Class: Insecta
- Order: Coleoptera
- Suborder: Polyphaga
- Infraorder: Cucujiformia
- Family: Coccinellidae
- Genus: Hyperaspis
- Species: H. conclusa

Binomial name
- Hyperaspis conclusa Weise, 1906

Synonyms
- Hyperaspis flavolineata Mader, 1957

Species of beetle

Hyperaspis conclusa is a species of beetle of the family Coccinellidae. It is found in southern South America.

== Description ==
Adults reach a length of about 1.9–2.2 mm. They have a black body and yellow head. The pronotum is yellow with a large basomedian black spot and a small brown spot. The vittate, lateral and apical margins of the elytron have a yellow border.
