= Hyperaspis zonula =

Scientific classification
- Kingdom: Animalia
- Phylum: Arthropoda
- Clade: Pancrustacea
- Class: Insecta
- Order: Coleoptera
- Suborder: Polyphaga
- Infraorder: Cucujiformia
- Family: Coccinellidae
- Genus: Hyperaspis
- Species: H. zonula

Binomial name
- Hyperaspis zonula Gordon & Canepari, 2008

Species of beetle

Hyperaspis zonula is a species of beetle of the family Coccinellidae. It is found in Brazil.

== Description ==
Adults reach a length of about 3.0–3.2 mm. They have a yellow body, the head with a black vertex. The pronotum has a basomedian brown band. The suture of the elytron is brown and there are brown vitta.

== Etymology ==
The species name is derived from Latin zona (meaning belt, girdle) and refers to the curved elytral vitta and rounded form.
