= Hyperaspis spiculinota =

Scientific classification
- Kingdom: Animalia
- Phylum: Arthropoda
- Clade: Pancrustacea
- Class: Insecta
- Order: Coleoptera
- Suborder: Polyphaga
- Infraorder: Cucujiformia
- Family: Coccinellidae
- Genus: Hyperaspis
- Species: H. spiculinota

Binomial name
- Hyperaspis spiculinota Fall, 1901

Species of beetle

Hyperaspis spiculinota is a species of beetle of the family Coccinellidae. It is found in North America, where it has been recorded from California.

== Description ==
Adults reach a length of about 2.40–3.00 mm. The elytron has a wedge shaped discal spot, a spot on lateral margin and an apical spot.
