= Hyperaspis querquesi =

Scientific classification
- Kingdom: Animalia
- Phylum: Arthropoda
- Clade: Pancrustacea
- Class: Insecta
- Order: Coleoptera
- Suborder: Polyphaga
- Infraorder: Cucujiformia
- Family: Coccinellidae
- Genus: Hyperaspis
- Species: H. querquesi

Binomial name
- Hyperaspis querquesi Nutting, 1980

Species of beetle

Hyperaspis querquesi is a species of beetle in the family Coccinellidae. It was described by Nutting in 1980. It is found in North America, where it has been recorded from California.

== Description ==
Adults reach a length of about 2.55-2.70 mm. The elytron is black with a large apical yellow spot and a small lateral spot.
