= Hyperaspis luciae =

Scientific classification
- Kingdom: Animalia
- Phylum: Arthropoda
- Clade: Pancrustacea
- Class: Insecta
- Order: Coleoptera
- Suborder: Polyphaga
- Infraorder: Cucujiformia
- Family: Coccinellidae
- Genus: Hyperaspis
- Species: H. luciae

Binomial name
- Hyperaspis luciae Gordon & González, 2011

Species of beetle

Hyperaspis luciae is a species of beetle of the family Coccinellidae. It is found in Brazil.

== Description ==
Adults reach a length of about 2.7 mm. They have a black body and yellow head. The anterior one-fifth and lateral one-fourth of the pronotum is yellow. The elytron is black, except for a small yellow spot.

== Etymology ==
The species is named in honour of Dr. Lúcia Massutti de Almeida.
