= Hyperaspis nunenmacheri =

Scientific classification
- Kingdom: Animalia
- Phylum: Arthropoda
- Clade: Pancrustacea
- Class: Insecta
- Order: Coleoptera
- Suborder: Polyphaga
- Infraorder: Cucujiformia
- Family: Coccinellidae
- Genus: Hyperaspis
- Species: H. nunenmacheri

Binomial name
- Hyperaspis nunenmacheri Casey, 1908

Species of beetle

Hyperaspis nunenmacheri is a species of beetle in the family Coccinellidae. It is found in North America, where it has been recorded from California and Oregon.

== Description ==
Adults reach a length of about 2.70-3.50 mm. The pronotum is black and the elytron is black with two yellow spots.
