= Hyperaspis lewisii =

Scientific classification
- Kingdom: Animalia
- Phylum: Arthropoda
- Clade: Pancrustacea
- Class: Insecta
- Order: Coleoptera
- Suborder: Polyphaga
- Infraorder: Cucujiformia
- Family: Coccinellidae
- Genus: Hyperaspis
- Species: H. lewisii

Binomial name
- Hyperaspis lewisii Crotch, 1873

Synonyms
- Hyperaspis lewisi; Hyperaspis maneei Casey, 1924

Species of beetle

Hyperaspis lewisii is a species of beetle in the family Coccinellidae. It is found in North America, where it has been recorded from Washington D.C., Florida, Kentucky, Maryland and New York.

== Description ==
Adults reach a length of about 3.0-3.80 mm. The anterior margin and lateral area of the pronotum of the males is yellow, while the pronotum of the females is black. The elytron has a large yellow discal spot.
