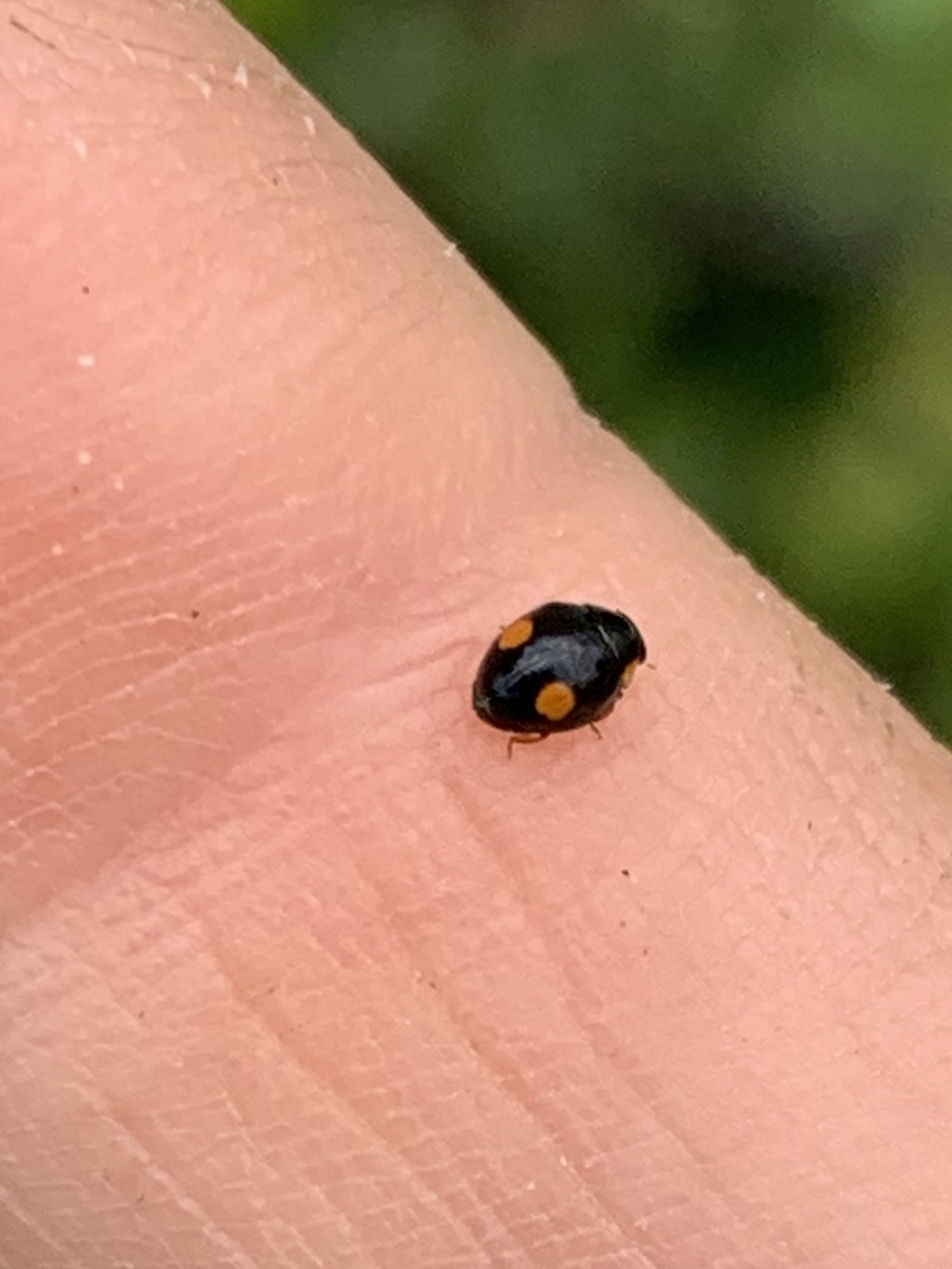

Scientific classification
- Kingdom: Animalia
- Phylum: Arthropoda
- Clade: Pancrustacea
- Class: Insecta
- Order: Coleoptera
- Suborder: Polyphaga
- Infraorder: Cucujiformia
- Family: Coccinellidae
- Genus: Hyperaspis
- Species: H. ornatella

Binomial name
- Hyperaspis ornatella Gordon, 1985

= Hyperaspis ornatella =

Species of beetle

Hyperaspis ornatella is a species of lady beetle in the family Coccinellidae. It is found in North America, where it has been recorded from Florida.

== Description ==
Adults reach a length of about 2.60 mm (males) and 2.40 mm (females). Males have a yellow head and the pronotum is yellow with a large rectangular black area medially. The elytron is black with a yellow spot. Females are similar to males, but have a black head and there is median black area on the pronotum.

== Etymology ==
The species name is derived from Latin ornamentum and refers to the distinctive colour pattern.
