= Hyperaspis vredenburgi =

Scientific classification
- Kingdom: Animalia
- Phylum: Arthropoda
- Clade: Pancrustacea
- Class: Insecta
- Order: Coleoptera
- Suborder: Polyphaga
- Infraorder: Cucujiformia
- Family: Coccinellidae
- Genus: Hyperaspis
- Species: H. vredenburgi

Binomial name
- Hyperaspis vredenburgi Gordon & Canepari, 2008

Species of beetle

Hyperaspis vredenburgi is a species of beetle of the family Coccinellidae. It is found in Brazil and Trinidad.

== Description ==
Adults reach a length of about 2.2 mm. They have a black body and yellow head. The pronotum is yellow with a large spot. The elytron has three yellow spots. Also, the lateral margin in the apical two-thirds is yellow.

== Etymology ==
The species is named for the collector of the type series.
