= Hyperaspis festiva =

Scientific classification
- Kingdom: Animalia
- Phylum: Arthropoda
- Clade: Pancrustacea
- Class: Insecta
- Order: Coleoptera
- Suborder: Polyphaga
- Infraorder: Cucujiformia
- Family: Coccinellidae
- Genus: Hyperaspis
- Species: H. festiva

Binomial name
- Hyperaspis festiva Mulsant, 1850

Synonyms
- Hyperaspis cincticollis Mulsant, 1850; Hyperaspis lemniscata Boheman, 1859; Hyperaspis festiva var. apicalis Weise, 1885; Hyperaspis juniapuca Brèthes, 1925

Species of beetle

Hyperaspis festiva is a species of beetle of the family Coccinellidae. It is found from Mexico and the Caribbean islands south to Argentina and Bolivia.

== Description ==
Adults reach a length of about 2.0–2.7 mm. They have a black body and yellow head. The pronotum is black, with the anterior border yellow and the lateral one-eight yellow. There is also a lateral yellow spot. The lateral and apical margins of the elytron have a yellow border and there is a triangular discal spot.
