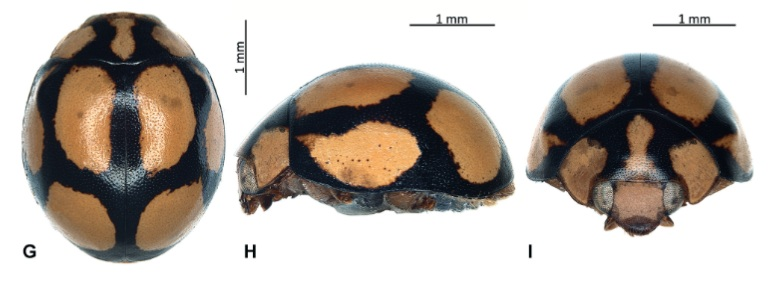

Scientific classification
- Kingdom: Animalia
- Phylum: Arthropoda
- Clade: Pancrustacea
- Class: Insecta
- Order: Coleoptera
- Suborder: Polyphaga
- Infraorder: Cucujiformia
- Family: Coccinellidae
- Genus: Hyperaspis
- Species: H. rutai

Binomial name
- Hyperaspis rutai Szawaryn & Czerwiński, 2022

= Hyperaspis rutai =

Species of beetle

Hyperaspis rutai is a species of beetle of the family Coccinellidae. It is found in Ecuador.

== Description ==
Adults reach a length of about 3.30 mm. Adults have a yellow head and the pronotum is black with three yellow spots. The elytron is black with three large yellow spots.

== Etymology ==
This species is dedicated to the Polish entomologist and expert in Scirtidae systematics, collector of the type series, Rafał Ruta (University of Wrocław).
