= Hyperaspis nana =

Scientific classification
- Kingdom: Animalia
- Phylum: Arthropoda
- Clade: Pancrustacea
- Class: Insecta
- Order: Coleoptera
- Suborder: Polyphaga
- Infraorder: Cucujiformia
- Family: Coccinellidae
- Genus: Hyperaspis
- Species: H. nana

Binomial name
- Hyperaspis nana Mader, 1957

Species of beetle

Hyperaspis nana is a species of beetle of the family Coccinellidae. It is found in Chile.

== Description ==
Adults reach a length of about 2.0–2.3 mm. They have a black body and yellow head. The pronotum is black with the anterior and lateral borders yellow. The lateral and apical margins of the elytron have a yellow border and there is an oval scutellar spot, as well as a large oval median discal spot.
