= Hyperaspis helveola =

Scientific classification
- Kingdom: Animalia
- Phylum: Arthropoda
- Clade: Pancrustacea
- Class: Insecta
- Order: Coleoptera
- Suborder: Polyphaga
- Infraorder: Cucujiformia
- Family: Coccinellidae
- Genus: Hyperaspis
- Species: H. helveola

Binomial name
- Hyperaspis helveola Gordon & Canepari, 2008

Species of beetle

Hyperaspis helveola is a species of beetle of the family Coccinellidae. It is found in Brazil.

== Description ==
Adults reach a length of about 2.7–3.2 mm. They have a yellow body. The pronotum has four brown spots. The elytron has two vaguely defined brown spots.

== Etymology ==
The species name is derived from Latin helvus (meaning yellow) and refers to the dorsal coloration.
