= Hyperaspis simulans =

Scientific classification
- Kingdom: Animalia
- Phylum: Arthropoda
- Clade: Pancrustacea
- Class: Insecta
- Order: Coleoptera
- Suborder: Polyphaga
- Infraorder: Cucujiformia
- Family: Coccinellidae
- Genus: Hyperaspis
- Species: H. simulans

Binomial name
- Hyperaspis simulans Casey, 1899

Species of beetle

Hyperaspis simulans is a species of beetle in the family Coccinellidae. It is found in North America, where it has been recorded from Arizona and Nevada.

== Description ==
Adults reach a length of about 2.30-2.70 mm. The elytron is black, sometimes with a faint yellow area on the humeral angle.
