= Hyperaspis camargoi =

Scientific classification
- Kingdom: Animalia
- Phylum: Arthropoda
- Clade: Pancrustacea
- Class: Insecta
- Order: Coleoptera
- Suborder: Polyphaga
- Infraorder: Cucujiformia
- Family: Coccinellidae
- Genus: Hyperaspis
- Species: H. camargoi

Binomial name
- Hyperaspis camargoi Gordon & Canepari, 2008

Species of beetle

Hyperaspis camargoi is a species of beetle of the family Coccinellidae. It is found in Brazil.

== Description ==
Adults reach a length of about 2.3–2.5 mm. They have a black body and yellow head. The lateral one-fourth and apical one-sixth of the pronotum are yellow. The elytron has two large yellow spots.

== Etymology ==
The species is named in honour of F. C. Camargo, the collector of the type series.
