= Hyperaspis humboldti =

Scientific classification
- Kingdom: Animalia
- Phylum: Arthropoda
- Clade: Pancrustacea
- Class: Insecta
- Order: Coleoptera
- Suborder: Polyphaga
- Infraorder: Cucujiformia
- Family: Coccinellidae
- Genus: Hyperaspis
- Species: H. humboldti

Binomial name
- Hyperaspis humboldti Gordon & González, 2011

Species of beetle

Hyperaspis humboldti is a species of beetle of the family Coccinellidae. It is found in Brazil.

== Description ==
Adults reach a length of about 2.3 mm. They have a yellow body. The sutural margin of the elytron is dark brown, the basal one-third is yellowish brown and there is a brown spot in the apical half.

== Etymology ==
The species is named in honour of German naturalist and explorer Alexander von Humboldt.
