= Hyperaspis cracentis =

Scientific classification
- Kingdom: Animalia
- Phylum: Arthropoda
- Clade: Pancrustacea
- Class: Insecta
- Order: Coleoptera
- Suborder: Polyphaga
- Infraorder: Cucujiformia
- Family: Coccinellidae
- Genus: Hyperaspis
- Species: H. cracentis

Binomial name
- Hyperaspis cracentis Gordon & Canepari, 2008

Species of beetle

Hyperaspis cracentis is a species of beetle of the family Coccinellidae. It is found in Brazil.

== Description ==
Adults reach a length of about 2.4–2.7 mm. They have a black body and a yellow head. The lateral one-fifth and apical one-fourth of the pronotum is yellow. The elytron has three small yellow spots.

== Etymology ==
The species name is derived from Latin cracens (meaning neat, graceful) and refers to the elegant and graceful dorsal appearance.
