= Hyperaspis siladesma =

Scientific classification
- Kingdom: Animalia
- Phylum: Arthropoda
- Clade: Pancrustacea
- Class: Insecta
- Order: Coleoptera
- Suborder: Polyphaga
- Infraorder: Cucujiformia
- Family: Coccinellidae
- Genus: Hyperaspis
- Species: H. siladesma

Binomial name
- Hyperaspis siladesma Gordon & Canepari, 2008

Species of beetle

Hyperaspis siladesma is a species of beetle of the family Coccinellidae. It is found in Brazil.

== Description ==
Adults reach a length of about 2.1 mm. They have a black body and yellow head. The pronotum is yellow with a large basomedian spot. The lateral border of the elytron and a discal spot are both yellow.

== Etymology ==
The species name is an arbitrary combination of letters.
