= Hyperaspis taeniata =

Scientific classification
- Kingdom: Animalia
- Phylum: Arthropoda
- Clade: Pancrustacea
- Class: Insecta
- Order: Coleoptera
- Suborder: Polyphaga
- Infraorder: Cucujiformia
- Family: Coccinellidae
- Genus: Hyperaspis
- Species: H. taeniata

Binomial name
- Hyperaspis taeniata LeConte, 1852

Synonyms
- Hyperaspis taeniata var. pallidula Dobzhansky, 1941; Hyperaspis taeniata var. pallescens Dobzhansky, 1941; Hyperaspis taeniata bipunctata Malkin, 1955

Species of beetle

Hyperaspis taeniata, the ribboned lady beetle, is a species of lady beetle in the family Coccinellidae. It is found in North America, where it has been recorded from California, Arizona and Utah.

== Description ==
Adults reach a length of about 2.20–3 mm. The lateral border of the pronotum of the males is yellow. The elytron has a large yellow spot.
