= Hyperaspis dissidens =

Scientific classification
- Kingdom: Animalia
- Phylum: Arthropoda
- Clade: Pancrustacea
- Class: Insecta
- Order: Coleoptera
- Suborder: Polyphaga
- Infraorder: Cucujiformia
- Family: Coccinellidae
- Genus: Hyperaspis
- Species: H. dissidens

Binomial name
- Hyperaspis dissidens Gordon & Canepari, 2008

Species of beetle

Hyperaspis dissidens is a species of beetle of the family Coccinellidae. It is found in Colombia.

== Description ==
Adults reach a length of about 2.7 mm. They have a black body and yellow head. The lateral one-third of the pronotum is yellow. The elytron has two yellow spots.

== Etymology ==
The species name is derived from Latin dissidens (meaning differing) and refers to the absence of prosternal carinae.
