= Hyperaspis imitatrix =

Scientific classification
- Kingdom: Animalia
- Phylum: Arthropoda
- Clade: Pancrustacea
- Class: Insecta
- Order: Coleoptera
- Suborder: Polyphaga
- Infraorder: Cucujiformia
- Family: Coccinellidae
- Genus: Hyperaspis
- Species: H. imitatrix

Binomial name
- Hyperaspis imitatrix Gordon & Canepari, 2008

Species of beetle

Hyperaspis imitatrix is a species of beetle of the family Coccinellidae. It is found in Brazil.

== Description ==
Adults reach a length of about 2.3 mm. They have a black body and a yellow hed. The pronotum has a large black spot. The elytron has five yellow spots.

== Etymology ==
The species name refers to the similarity in size, shape, and color pattern to some variations of Hyperaspis incompleta.
