= Hyperaspis bensonica =

Scientific classification
- Kingdom: Animalia
- Phylum: Arthropoda
- Clade: Pancrustacea
- Class: Insecta
- Order: Coleoptera
- Suborder: Polyphaga
- Infraorder: Cucujiformia
- Family: Coccinellidae
- Genus: Hyperaspis
- Species: H. bensonica

Binomial name
- Hyperaspis bensonica Casey, 1908

Species of beetle

Hyperaspis bensonica is a species of lady beetle in the family Coccinellidae. It is found in North America, where it has been recorded from Arizona, California and Texas.

== Description ==
Adults reach a length of about 1.90-2.90 mm. The lateral and anterior margins of the pronotum of the males are yellow. The elytron has a discal spot and a lateral vitta.
