= Hyperaspis laterimacula =

Scientific classification
- Kingdom: Animalia
- Phylum: Arthropoda
- Clade: Pancrustacea
- Class: Insecta
- Order: Coleoptera
- Suborder: Polyphaga
- Infraorder: Cucujiformia
- Family: Coccinellidae
- Genus: Hyperaspis
- Species: H. laterimacula

Binomial name
- Hyperaspis laterimacula Gordon & Canepari, 2008

Species of beetle

Hyperaspis laterimacula is a species of beetle of the family Coccinellidae. It is found in Bolivia.

== Description ==
Adults reach a length of about 1.8 mm. They have a brown body and yellow head. The pronotum is yellow with a brown spot. The elytron has five yellow spots.

== Etymology ==
The species name is a combination of Latin latus (meaning side) and macula (meaning spot) and refers to the three large lateral spots on each elytron.
