= Hyperaspis immaculata =

Scientific classification
- Kingdom: Animalia
- Phylum: Arthropoda
- Clade: Pancrustacea
- Class: Insecta
- Order: Coleoptera
- Suborder: Polyphaga
- Infraorder: Cucujiformia
- Family: Coccinellidae
- Genus: Hyperaspis
- Species: H. immaculata

Binomial name
- Hyperaspis immaculata Hatch, 1961

Species of beetle

Hyperaspis immaculata is a species of beetle in the family Coccinellidae. It is found in North America, where it has been recorded from Washington and Oregon.

== Description ==
Adults reach a length of about 2.0 mm. The pronotum is yellow and the elytron is black.
