= Hyperaspis imitator =

Scientific classification
- Kingdom: Animalia
- Phylum: Arthropoda
- Clade: Pancrustacea
- Class: Insecta
- Order: Coleoptera
- Suborder: Polyphaga
- Infraorder: Cucujiformia
- Family: Coccinellidae
- Genus: Hyperaspis
- Species: H. imitator

Binomial name
- Hyperaspis imitator Gordon, 1985

Species of beetle

Hyperaspis imitator is a species of lady beetle in the family Coccinellidae. It is found in North America, where it has been recorded from Texas.

== Description ==
Adults reach a length of about 2 mm (males) and 2.25 mm (females). The elytron is black with a discal spot and a lateral yellow vitta.
