= Hyperaspis herrerai =

Scientific classification
- Kingdom: Animalia
- Phylum: Arthropoda
- Clade: Pancrustacea
- Class: Insecta
- Order: Coleoptera
- Suborder: Polyphaga
- Infraorder: Cucujiformia
- Family: Coccinellidae
- Genus: Hyperaspis
- Species: H. herrerai

Binomial name
- Hyperaspis herrerai Gordon & Canepari, 2008

Species of beetle

Hyperaspis herrerai is a species of beetle of the family Coccinellidae. It is found in Colombia.

== Description ==
Adults reach a length of about 2.4 mm. They have a reddish yellow body and yellow head. The pronotum has a large black rectangular spot. The elytron has a large triangular spot in the middle and a small oval black spot on the humeral callus.

== Etymology ==
The species is named for J. Herrera, collector of the holotype specimen.
