= Hyperaspis lanatii =

Scientific classification
- Kingdom: Animalia
- Phylum: Arthropoda
- Clade: Pancrustacea
- Class: Insecta
- Order: Coleoptera
- Suborder: Polyphaga
- Infraorder: Cucujiformia
- Family: Coccinellidae
- Genus: Hyperaspis
- Species: H. lanatii

Binomial name
- Hyperaspis lanatii González & Gordon, 2009

Species of beetle

Hyperaspis lanatii is a species of beetle of the family Coccinellidae. It is found in Argentina.

== Description ==
Adults reach a length of about 2.1–2.4 mm. Adults are black with a yellow head. The lateral one-sixth and anterior border of the pronotum are yellow and the elytron is black with a yellow lateral margin.

== Etymology ==
The species is named for the collector of the type series, the Argentinean entomologist Silvio Lanati.
