= Hyperaspis tayronensis =

Scientific classification
- Kingdom: Animalia
- Phylum: Arthropoda
- Clade: Pancrustacea
- Class: Insecta
- Order: Coleoptera
- Suborder: Polyphaga
- Infraorder: Cucujiformia
- Family: Coccinellidae
- Genus: Hyperaspis
- Species: H. tayronensis

Binomial name
- Hyperaspis tayronensis Gordon & Canepari, 2008

Species of beetle

Hyperaspis tayronensis is a species of beetle of the family Coccinellidae. It is found in Colombia.

== Description ==
Adults reach a length of about 2.3–2.5 mm. They have a dark brown body and yellow head. The pronotum is yellow with a small median brown spot and a large anchor-shaped brown spot. The elytron has seven small yellow spots.

== Etymology ==
The species is named for Parque Tayrona, where the holotype was collected.
