= Hyperaspis conspirans =

Scientific classification
- Kingdom: Animalia
- Phylum: Arthropoda
- Clade: Pancrustacea
- Class: Insecta
- Order: Coleoptera
- Suborder: Polyphaga
- Infraorder: Cucujiformia
- Family: Coccinellidae
- Genus: Hyperaspis
- Species: H. conspirans

Binomial name
- Hyperaspis conspirans Casey, 1908

Species of beetle

Hyperaspis conspirans is a species of lady beetle in the family Coccinellidae. It is found in North America, where it has been recorded from Arizona and Texas.

== Description ==
Adults reach a length of about 1.90-2.30 mm. The pronotum of the males is black with a yellow lateral area, while the pronotum of the females has the yellow area slightly reddened. The elytron has three yellow spots.
