= Hyperaspis pectoralis =

Scientific classification
- Kingdom: Animalia
- Phylum: Arthropoda
- Clade: Pancrustacea
- Class: Insecta
- Order: Coleoptera
- Suborder: Polyphaga
- Infraorder: Cucujiformia
- Family: Coccinellidae
- Genus: Hyperaspis
- Species: H. pectoralis

Binomial name
- Hyperaspis pectoralis Crotch, 1874

Species of beetle

Hyperaspis pectoralis is a species of beetle of the family Coccinellidae. It is found in Brazil.

== Description ==
Adults reach a length of about 3 mm. They have a yellow body. The pronotum has two small faint brown basal spots. Both the pronotum and elytron appear dirty yellow because of various brown dorsal punctures.
