= Hyperaspis eupaleoides =

Scientific classification
- Kingdom: Animalia
- Phylum: Arthropoda
- Clade: Pancrustacea
- Class: Insecta
- Order: Coleoptera
- Suborder: Polyphaga
- Infraorder: Cucujiformia
- Family: Coccinellidae
- Genus: Hyperaspis
- Species: H. eupaleoides

Binomial name
- Hyperaspis eupaleoides Crotch, 1874

Synonyms
- Hyperaspis graphica Weise, 1902

Species of beetle

Hyperaspis eupaleoides is a species of beetle of the family Coccinellidae. It is found in Brazil.

== Description ==
Adults reach a length of about 3.0-3.3 mm. They have a yellow body. The pronotum has four triangular brown spots. The elytron has a brown sutural margin and four brown spots.
