= Hyperaspis protensa =

Scientific classification
- Kingdom: Animalia
- Phylum: Arthropoda
- Clade: Pancrustacea
- Class: Insecta
- Order: Coleoptera
- Suborder: Polyphaga
- Infraorder: Cucujiformia
- Family: Coccinellidae
- Genus: Hyperaspis
- Species: H. protensa

Binomial name
- Hyperaspis protensa Casey, 1908

Synonyms
- Oxynychus moerens LeConte, 1850

Species of beetle

Hyperaspis protensa is a species of beetle in the family Coccinellidae. It is found in North America, where it has been recorded from Arizona.

== Description ==
Adults reach a length of about 1.50-2.20 mm. The elytron is black with a vitta on the lateral margin.
