= Hyperaspis octomaculata =

Scientific classification
- Kingdom: Animalia
- Phylum: Arthropoda
- Clade: Pancrustacea
- Class: Insecta
- Order: Coleoptera
- Suborder: Polyphaga
- Infraorder: Cucujiformia
- Family: Coccinellidae
- Genus: Hyperaspis
- Species: H. octomaculata

Binomial name
- Hyperaspis octomaculata González, 2024

Synonyms
- Hyperaspis octonotata Gordon & Canepari, 2008 (preocc.)

Species of beetle

Hyperaspis octomaculata is a species of beetle of the family Coccinellidae. It is found in Colombia.

== Description ==
Adults reach a length of about 2.9 mm. They have a yellow body. The pronotum has four median brown spots. The elytron has four oval brown spots and a brown sutural margin.

== Etymology ==
The original species name octonotata was derived from Latin octo (meaning eight) and notata (meaning mark) and referred to the eight brown marks on the elytra.
