= Hyperaspis chocoi =

Scientific classification
- Kingdom: Animalia
- Phylum: Arthropoda
- Clade: Pancrustacea
- Class: Insecta
- Order: Coleoptera
- Suborder: Polyphaga
- Infraorder: Cucujiformia
- Family: Coccinellidae
- Genus: Hyperaspis
- Species: H. chocoi

Binomial name
- Hyperaspis chocoi Gordon & Canepari, 2008

Species of beetle

Hyperaspis chocoi is a species of beetle of the family Coccinellidae. It is found in Colombia.

== Description ==
Adults reach a length of about 2.3 mm. They have a black body and yellow head. The pronotum is yellow with a large basomedian spot. The elytron has one large long yellow spot.

== Etymology ==
The species is named for the Department of Choco, where the type series was collected.
