= Hyperaspis postica =

Scientific classification
- Kingdom: Animalia
- Phylum: Arthropoda
- Clade: Pancrustacea
- Class: Insecta
- Order: Coleoptera
- Suborder: Polyphaga
- Infraorder: Cucujiformia
- Family: Coccinellidae
- Genus: Hyperaspis
- Species: H. postica

Binomial name
- Hyperaspis postica Leconte, 1880

Synonyms
- Hyperaspis elliptica Casey, 1899; Hyperaspis essigi Malkin, 1955

Species of beetle

Hyperaspis postica, the postica lady beetle, is a species of lady beetle in the family Coccinellidae. It is found in North America, where it has been recorded from British Columbia to southern California. It is also found in Alberta, Arizona and Colorado.

== Description ==
Adults reach a length of about 2.30-3.10 mm. The elytron has one apical spot varying in size and shape.
