= Hyperaspis ingrata =

Scientific classification
- Kingdom: Animalia
- Phylum: Arthropoda
- Clade: Pancrustacea
- Class: Insecta
- Order: Coleoptera
- Suborder: Polyphaga
- Infraorder: Cucujiformia
- Family: Coccinellidae
- Genus: Hyperaspis
- Species: H. ingrata

Binomial name
- Hyperaspis ingrata (Mulsant, 1850)

Synonyms
- Cleothera ingrata Mulsant, 1850

Species of beetle

Hyperaspis ingrata is a species of beetle of the family Coccinellidae. It is found in French Guiana.

== Description ==
Adults reach a length of about 2.4 mm. They have a black body. The anterior border of the pronotum is yellowish red. The elytron has an oval reddish yellow spot.
