= Hyperaspis guilloryi =

Scientific classification
- Kingdom: Animalia
- Phylum: Arthropoda
- Clade: Pancrustacea
- Class: Insecta
- Order: Coleoptera
- Suborder: Polyphaga
- Infraorder: Cucujiformia
- Family: Coccinellidae
- Genus: Hyperaspis
- Species: H. guilloryi

Binomial name
- Hyperaspis guilloryi (Mulsant, 1850)

Synonyms
- Cleothera guilloryi Mulsant, 1850

Species of beetle

Hyperaspis guilloryi is a species of beetle of the family Coccinellidae. It is found in Colombia.

== Description ==
Adults reach a length of about 1.6 mm. They have a black body. The elytron is dark brown with a large oval yellow spot.
