= Hyperaspis simlaensis =

Scientific classification
- Kingdom: Animalia
- Phylum: Arthropoda
- Clade: Pancrustacea
- Class: Insecta
- Order: Coleoptera
- Suborder: Polyphaga
- Infraorder: Cucujiformia
- Family: Coccinellidae
- Genus: Hyperaspis
- Species: H. simlaensis

Binomial name
- Hyperaspis simlaensis Gordon & Canepari, 2008

Species of beetle

Hyperaspis simlaensis is a species of beetle of the family Coccinellidae. It is found in Trinidad and Venezuela.

== Description ==
Adults reach a length of about 2.0–2.3 mm. They have a dark brown body and yellow head. The anterior margin and lateral one-fourth of the pronotum are yellow. The elytron has four yellow spots.

== Etymology ==
The species is named for a paratype locality.
