= Hyperaspis scutifera =

Scientific classification
- Kingdom: Animalia
- Phylum: Arthropoda
- Clade: Pancrustacea
- Class: Insecta
- Order: Coleoptera
- Suborder: Polyphaga
- Infraorder: Cucujiformia
- Family: Coccinellidae
- Genus: Hyperaspis
- Species: H. scutifera

Binomial name
- Hyperaspis scutifera (Mulsant, 1850)

Synonyms
- Cleothera scutifera Mulsant, 1850; Hyperapis incompleta Crotch, 1874; Hyperaspis sanctaeritae Dobzhansky, 1941

Species of beetle

Hyperaspis scutifera is a species of beetle of the family Coccinellidae. It is found in Venezuela and Colombia and on Curaçao, as well as in Arizona.

== Description ==
Adults reach a length of about 2.4–2.6 mm. They have a yellow body. The pronotum is black, but the lateral one-fifth is yellow. The elytron has a black sutural spot and a small poorly defined spot on the humeral callus.
