= Hyperaspis corcovado =

Scientific classification
- Kingdom: Animalia
- Phylum: Arthropoda
- Clade: Pancrustacea
- Class: Insecta
- Order: Coleoptera
- Suborder: Polyphaga
- Infraorder: Cucujiformia
- Family: Coccinellidae
- Genus: Hyperaspis
- Species: H. corcovado

Binomial name
- Hyperaspis corcovado Gordon & González, 2011

Species of beetle

Hyperaspis corcovado is a species of beetle of the family Coccinellidae. It is found in Brazil.

== Description ==
Adults reach a length of about 3 mm. They have a reddish yellow body and a yellow head. The pronotum has a narrow black marking. The sutural border of the elytron is black.

== Etymology ==
The species name refers to the type locality.
