= Hyperaspis borealis =

Scientific classification
- Kingdom: Animalia
- Phylum: Arthropoda
- Clade: Pancrustacea
- Class: Insecta
- Order: Coleoptera
- Suborder: Polyphaga
- Infraorder: Cucujiformia
- Family: Coccinellidae
- Genus: Hyperaspis
- Species: H. borealis

Binomial name
- Hyperaspis borealis Dobzhansky, 1941

Synonyms
- Hyperaspis oregona borealis Dobzhansky, 1941; Hyperaspis obscura Malkin, 1943; Hyperaspis simuloides Hatch, 1961; Hyperaspis schuhi Hatch, 1961; Hyperaspis elali Nutting, 1980

Species of beetle

Hyperaspis borealis is a species of beetle of the family Coccinellidae. It is found in North America, where it has been recorded from British Columbia, California, Oregon and Mississippi and Washington.

== Description ==
Adults reach a length of about 2.10–3.00 mm. The elytron is black with the discal and lateral vittae joined at the apex.
