= Hyperaspis colombiensis =

Scientific classification
- Kingdom: Animalia
- Phylum: Arthropoda
- Clade: Pancrustacea
- Class: Insecta
- Order: Coleoptera
- Suborder: Polyphaga
- Infraorder: Cucujiformia
- Family: Coccinellidae
- Genus: Hyperaspis
- Species: H. colombiensis

Binomial name
- Hyperaspis colombiensis Gordon & Canepari, 2008

Species of beetle

Hyperaspis colombiensis is a species of beetle of the family Coccinellidae. It is found in Colombia.

== Description ==
Adults reach a length of about 2.4 mm. They have a yellow body. The pronotum has four brown spots. The elytron is reddish yellow with four brown spots.

== Etymology ==
The species is named for Colombia, where the holotype was collected.
