= Hyperaspis uteana =

Scientific classification
- Kingdom: Animalia
- Phylum: Arthropoda
- Clade: Pancrustacea
- Class: Insecta
- Order: Coleoptera
- Suborder: Polyphaga
- Infraorder: Cucujiformia
- Family: Coccinellidae
- Genus: Hyperaspis
- Species: H. uteana

Binomial name
- Hyperaspis uteana Gordon, 1985

Species of beetle

Hyperaspis uteana is a species of beetle in the family Coccinellidae. It is found in North America, where it has been recorded from Utah.

== Description ==
Adults reach a length of about 2.40 mm (males) and 2.60 mm (females). The pronotum of the males has a lateral yellow area and there is a yellow vitta on the apical margin. The elytron is black with a large orange spot. The pronotum of the females does not have the anterior yellow vitta and the elytron has an apical yellow spot.

== Etymology ==
The species name refers to the state in which the type series was collected.
