= Hyperaspis ayacucho =

Scientific classification
- Kingdom: Animalia
- Phylum: Arthropoda
- Clade: Pancrustacea
- Class: Insecta
- Order: Coleoptera
- Suborder: Polyphaga
- Infraorder: Cucujiformia
- Family: Coccinellidae
- Genus: Hyperaspis
- Species: H. ayacucho

Binomial name
- Hyperaspis ayacucho Gordon & Canepari, 2008

Species of beetle

Hyperaspis ayacucho is a species of beetle of the family Coccinellidae. It is found in Venezuela.

== Description ==
Adults reach a length of about 2.3 mm. They have a black body and yellow head. The pronotum is black, with the anterior one-sixth and lateral one-fifth yellow. The elytron has a broad yellow border.

== Etymology ==
The species is named for the holotype locality.
