= Hyperaspis arida =

Scientific classification
- Kingdom: Animalia
- Phylum: Arthropoda
- Clade: Pancrustacea
- Class: Insecta
- Order: Coleoptera
- Suborder: Polyphaga
- Infraorder: Cucujiformia
- Family: Coccinellidae
- Genus: Hyperaspis
- Species: H. arida

Binomial name
- Hyperaspis arida Gordon & Canepari, 2008

Species of beetle

Hyperaspis arida is a species of beetle of the family Coccinellidae. It is found in Peru.

== Description ==
Adults reach a length of about 2.3–3.6 mm. They have a yellow body. The pronotum has a black spot. The base (near the scutellum) and the sutural margin of the elytron are black and there are three median spots.

== Etymology ==
The species name is derived from Latin aridus (meaning dry) and refers to the Peruvian coastal desert type locality.
