= Hyperaspis concavus =

Scientific classification
- Kingdom: Animalia
- Phylum: Arthropoda
- Clade: Pancrustacea
- Class: Insecta
- Order: Coleoptera
- Suborder: Polyphaga
- Infraorder: Cucujiformia
- Family: Coccinellidae
- Genus: Hyperaspis
- Species: H. concavus

Binomial name
- Hyperaspis concavus Watson, 1969

Species of beetle

Hyperaspis concavus is a species of beetle in the family Coccinellidae. It is found in North America, where it has been recorded from New Hampshire and New York.

== Description ==
Adults reach a length of about 2.60-3.50 mm. The pronotum of the males is black, with a yellow anterior margin and lateral area, while the pronotum of the females is black. The elytron has one orange spot.
