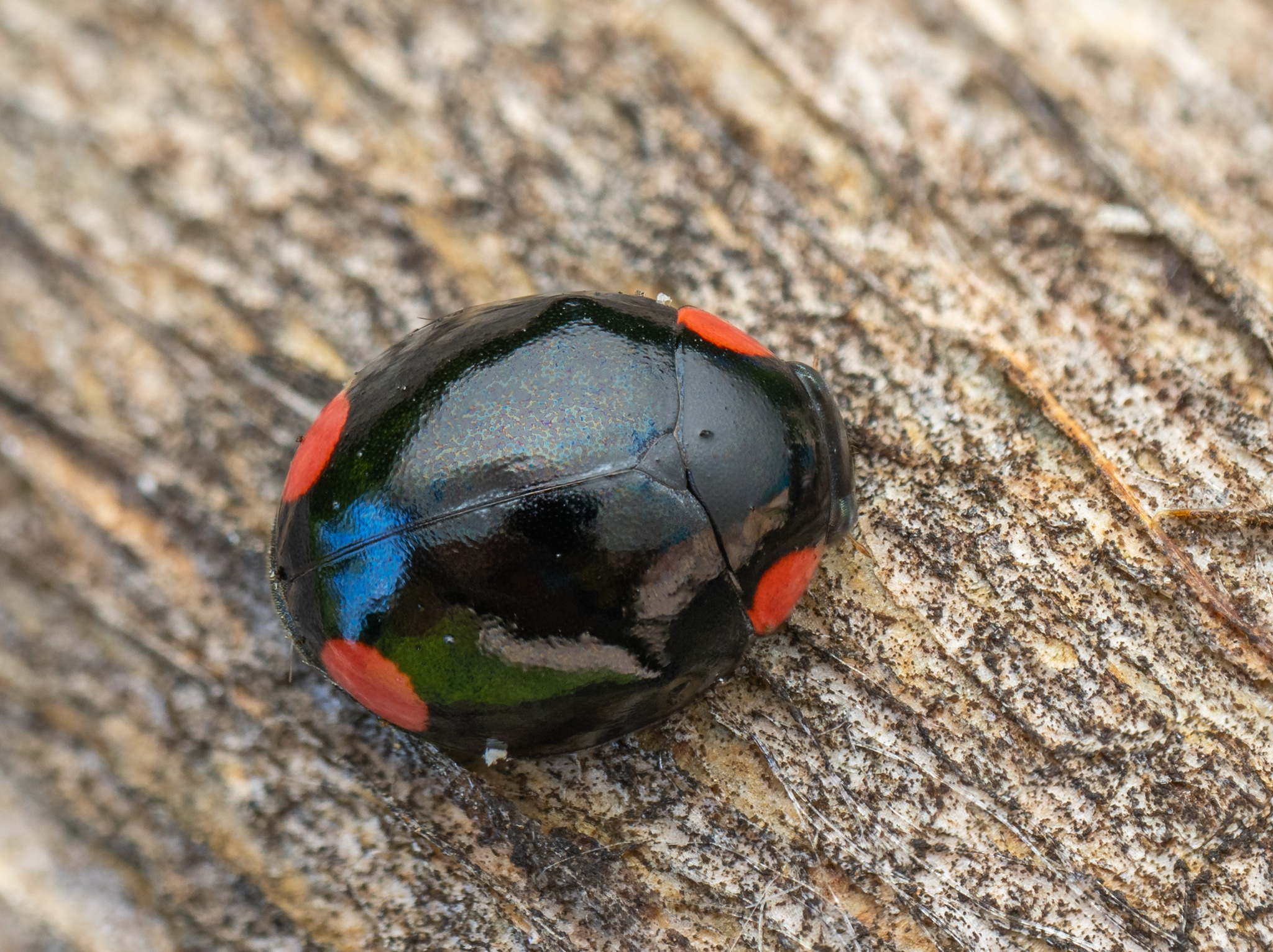

Scientific classification
- Kingdom: Animalia
- Phylum: Arthropoda
- Clade: Pancrustacea
- Class: Insecta
- Order: Coleoptera
- Suborder: Polyphaga
- Infraorder: Cucujiformia
- Family: Coccinellidae
- Genus: Hyperaspis
- Species: H. bigeminata

Binomial name
- Hyperaspis bigeminata (Randall, 1838)

Synonyms
- Coccinella bigeminata Randall, 1838; Hyperaspis guexi Mulsant, 1850

= Hyperaspis bigeminata =

Species of beetle

Hyperaspis bigeminata, the bigeminy lady beetle, is a species of lady beetle in the family Coccinellidae. It is found in North America, where it has been recorded from Maine to Florida, west to Michigan and east Texas.

== Description ==
Adults reach a length of about 2.40-3.35 mm. The anterior margin and lateral area of the pronotum of the males is yellow, while the pronotum of the females has a black anterior margin and a yellow lateral area. The elytron has one yellow or red apical spot.
