= Hyperaspis globula =

Scientific classification
- Kingdom: Animalia
- Phylum: Arthropoda
- Clade: Pancrustacea
- Class: Insecta
- Order: Coleoptera
- Suborder: Polyphaga
- Infraorder: Cucujiformia
- Family: Coccinellidae
- Genus: Hyperaspis
- Species: H. globula

Binomial name
- Hyperaspis globula Casey, 1899

Species of beetle

Hyperaspis globula, the globular lady beetle, is a species of lady beetle in the family Coccinellidae. It is found in North America, where it has been recorded from Texas.

== Description ==
Adults reach a length of about 1.80–2 mm. The pronotum has a large lateral yellow. In males, the anterior border is yellow, while it is black in females. The elytron has one yellow discal spot.
