= Hyperaspis oregona =

Scientific classification
- Kingdom: Animalia
- Phylum: Arthropoda
- Clade: Pancrustacea
- Class: Insecta
- Order: Coleoptera
- Suborder: Polyphaga
- Infraorder: Cucujiformia
- Family: Coccinellidae
- Genus: Hyperaspis
- Species: H. oregona

Binomial name
- Hyperaspis oregona Dobzhansky, 1941

Synonyms
- Hyperaspis lanei Hatch, 1961

Species of beetle

Hyperaspis oregona is a species of beetle inf the family Coccinellidae. It is found in North America, where it has been recorded from Alberta, British Columbia, California, Idaho, Washington and Wyoming.

== Description ==
Adults reach a length of about 2.0-2.60 mm. The elytron is black with a discal vitta, an apical spot and a narrow marginal vitta.
