= Hyperaspis praecipua =

Scientific classification
- Kingdom: Animalia
- Phylum: Arthropoda
- Clade: Pancrustacea
- Class: Insecta
- Order: Coleoptera
- Suborder: Polyphaga
- Infraorder: Cucujiformia
- Family: Coccinellidae
- Genus: Hyperaspis
- Species: H. praecipua

Binomial name
- Hyperaspis praecipua Gordon & González, 2011

Species of beetle

Hyperaspis praecipua is a species of beetle of the family Coccinellidae. It is found in Colombia.

== Description ==
Adults reach a length of about 2.9 mm. They have a black body and yellow head. The pronotum has a black marking and two large elongate yellow eyespots. The elytron has five yellow spots.

== Etymology ==
The species name is derived from Latin praecipuus (meaning special or peculiar) and refers to the unique characteristics of this species.
