= Hyperaspis octonotata =

Scientific classification
- Kingdom: Animalia
- Phylum: Arthropoda
- Clade: Pancrustacea
- Class: Insecta
- Order: Coleoptera
- Suborder: Polyphaga
- Infraorder: Cucujiformia
- Family: Coccinellidae
- Genus: Hyperaspis
- Species: H. octonotata

Binomial name
- Hyperaspis octonotata Casey, 1899

Synonyms
- Hyperaspis 8-notata Casey 1899

Species of beetle

Hyperaspis octonotata, the eight-spotted lady beetle, is a species of lady beetle in the family Coccinellidae. It is found in North America (western United States to southernmost Texas).

== Description ==
Adults reach a length of about 2.3-3.5 mm. The elytron has four distinct spots.

== Biology ==
It feeds on aphids and other small soft-bodied insects.
