= Hyperaspis fimbriolata =

Scientific classification
- Kingdom: Animalia
- Phylum: Arthropoda
- Clade: Pancrustacea
- Class: Insecta
- Order: Coleoptera
- Suborder: Polyphaga
- Infraorder: Cucujiformia
- Family: Coccinellidae
- Genus: Hyperaspis
- Species: H. fimbriolata

Binomial name
- Hyperaspis fimbriolata Melsheimer, 1847

Synonyms
- Hyperaspis rufomarginata Mulsant, 1850; Hyperaspis fimbriolata atlantica Dobzhansky, 1941

Species of beetle

Hyperaspis fimbriolata is a species of beetle of the family Coccinellidae. It is found in North America, where it has been recorded from coastal areas from Pennsylvania to Florida and Mississippi.

== Description ==
Adults reach a length of about 2.35–2.60 mm. The pronotum of the males has a lateral yellow area. The elytron is black with a vitta.
