= Hyperaspis arizonica =

Scientific classification
- Kingdom: Animalia
- Phylum: Arthropoda
- Clade: Pancrustacea
- Class: Insecta
- Order: Coleoptera
- Suborder: Polyphaga
- Infraorder: Cucujiformia
- Family: Coccinellidae
- Genus: Hyperaspis
- Species: H. arizonica

Binomial name
- Hyperaspis arizonica Dobzhansky, 1941

Synonyms
- Hyperaspis biornata arizonica Dobzhansky, 1941

Species of beetle

Hyperaspis arizonica is a species of beetle in the family Coccinellidae. It is found in North America, where it has been recorded from Arizona and California.

== Description ==
Adults reach a length of about 2.30-3.0 mm. The elytron is black with a large orange spot on the outer margin.
