= Hyperaspis senegalensis =

Scientific classification
- Kingdom: Animalia
- Phylum: Arthropoda
- Clade: Pancrustacea
- Class: Insecta
- Order: Coleoptera
- Suborder: Polyphaga
- Infraorder: Cucujiformia
- Family: Coccinellidae
- Genus: Hyperaspis
- Species: H. senegalensis

Binomial name
- Hyperaspis senegalensis Mulsant, 1850

Synonyms
- Cleothera senegalensis Mulsant, 1850; Hyperaspis abyssinica Fürsch, 1960; Hyperaspis hottentota Mulsant, 1850

Species of beetle

Hyperaspis senegalensis is a species of beetle in the family Coccinellidae. It is native to Africa, but has also been introduced to northern California to combat scale insects attacking ice plant.

== Description ==
Adults reach a length of about 3.40-3.90 mm. The pronotum of the males is black, with the lateral one-third and the apical margin yellow. The elytron is black with yellow apical spot.

== Subspecies ==
- Hyperaspis senegalensis senegalensis (Senegal)
- Hyperaspis senegalensis abyssinica Fürsch, 1960 (Ethiopia)
- Hyperaspis senegalensis hottentota (Mulsant, 1850) (South Africa, California)
