= Hyperaspis abertha =

Scientific classification
- Kingdom: Animalia
- Phylum: Arthropoda
- Clade: Pancrustacea
- Class: Insecta
- Order: Coleoptera
- Suborder: Polyphaga
- Infraorder: Cucujiformia
- Family: Coccinellidae
- Genus: Hyperaspis
- Species: H. abertha

Binomial name
- Hyperaspis abertha Gordon & Canepari, 2008

Species of beetle

Hyperaspis abertha is a species of beetle of the family Coccinellidae. It is found in Brazil.

== Description ==
Adults reach a length of about 3.3 mm. They have a black body and yellow head. The pronotum is black, with the lateral one-fourth yellow. The lateral one-fourth of the pronotum is also yellow. The elytron has one large yellow apical spot.

== Etymology ==
The specific name is an arbitrary combination of letters.
