= Hyperaspis jasperensis =

Scientific classification
- Kingdom: Animalia
- Phylum: Arthropoda
- Clade: Pancrustacea
- Class: Insecta
- Order: Coleoptera
- Suborder: Polyphaga
- Infraorder: Cucujiformia
- Family: Coccinellidae
- Genus: Hyperaspis
- Species: H. jasperensis

Binomial name
- Hyperaspis jasperensis Belicek, 1976

Species of beetle

Hyperaspis jasperensis is a species of beetle in the family Coccinellidae. It is found in North America, where it has been recorded from Alberta, the Northwest Territories, Colorado and Wyoming.

== Description ==
Adults reach a length of about 1.5–2 mm. The pronotum is brownish black, with the lateral margin slightly paler. The elytron is brownish black.
