= Hyperaspis pluto =

Scientific classification
- Kingdom: Animalia
- Phylum: Arthropoda
- Clade: Pancrustacea
- Class: Insecta
- Order: Coleoptera
- Suborder: Polyphaga
- Infraorder: Cucujiformia
- Family: Coccinellidae
- Genus: Hyperaspis
- Species: H. pluto

Binomial name
- Hyperaspis pluto Fall, 1925

Species of beetle

Hyperaspis pluto is a species of beetle in the family Coccinellidae. It is found in North America, where it has been recorded from California.

== Description ==
Adults reach a length of about 3.50-3.75 mm. The pronotum of the females is black with a reddish yellow lateral. The elytron is black.
