= Hyperaspis mariposa =

Scientific classification
- Kingdom: Animalia
- Phylum: Arthropoda
- Clade: Pancrustacea
- Class: Insecta
- Order: Coleoptera
- Suborder: Polyphaga
- Infraorder: Cucujiformia
- Family: Coccinellidae
- Genus: Hyperaspis
- Species: H. mariposa

Binomial name
- Hyperaspis mariposa Gordon & Canepari, 2008

Species of beetle

Hyperaspis mariposa is a species of beetle of the family Coccinellidae. It is found in Ecuador.

== Description ==
Adults reach a length of about 3 mm. They have a yellow body. The pronotum has a dark brown transverse vitta with two dark brown projections. The elytron has an irregular discal spot.

== Etymology ==
The species name means butterfly in Spanish, referring to the butterfly-shaped elytral macula.
