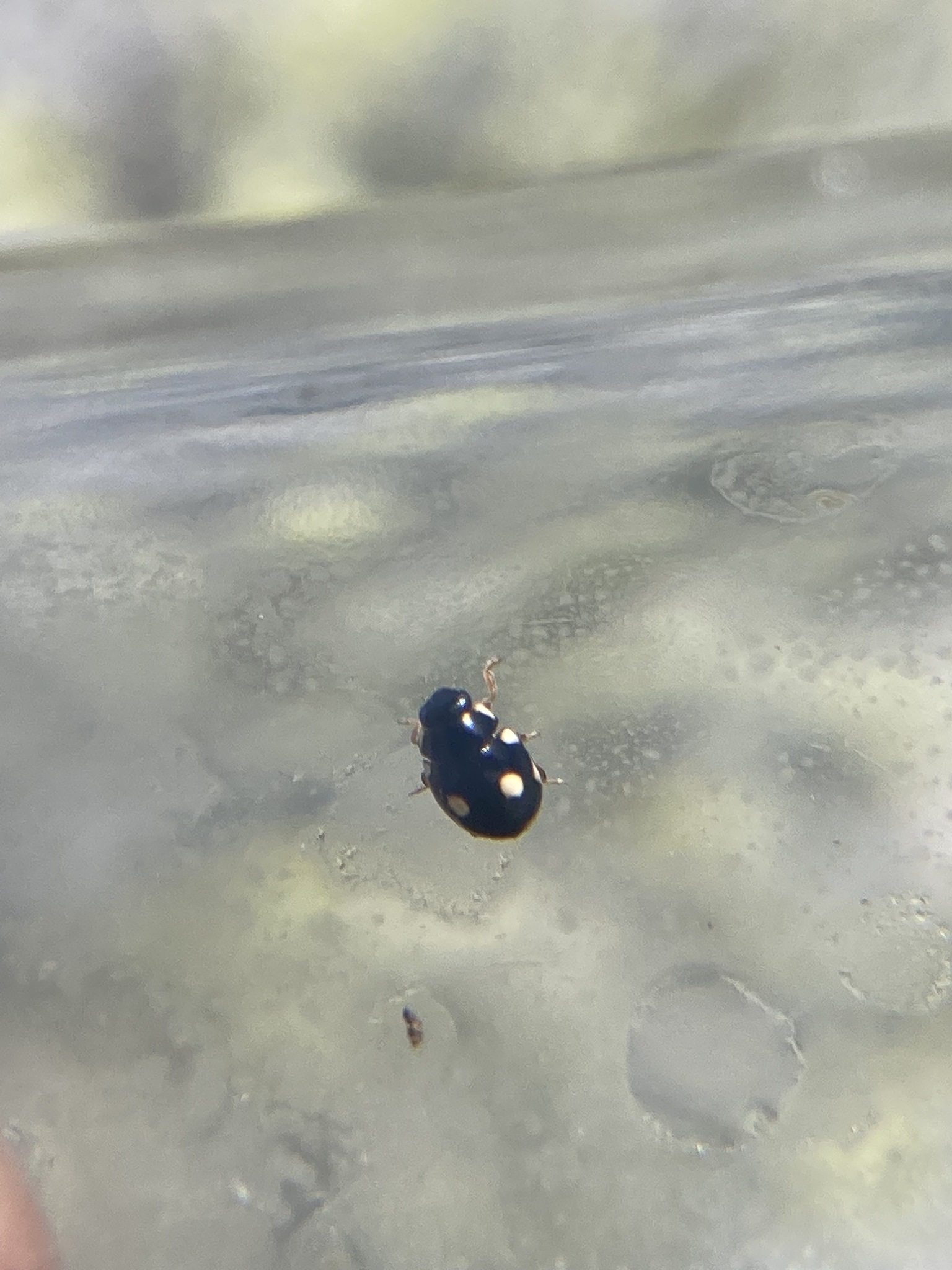

Scientific classification
- Kingdom: Animalia
- Phylum: Arthropoda
- Clade: Pancrustacea
- Class: Insecta
- Order: Coleoptera
- Suborder: Polyphaga
- Infraorder: Cucujiformia
- Family: Coccinellidae
- Genus: Hyperaspis
- Species: H. octavia

Binomial name
- Hyperaspis octavia Casey, 1908

= Hyperaspis octavia =

Species of beetle

Hyperaspis octavia is a species of lady beetle in the family Coccinellidae. It is found in North America, where it has been recorded from Mississippi, Quebec and Michigan.

It is about 2.5mm long, oval-shaped, and shiny black with pale red-brown spots. The legs are also a paler brown.
