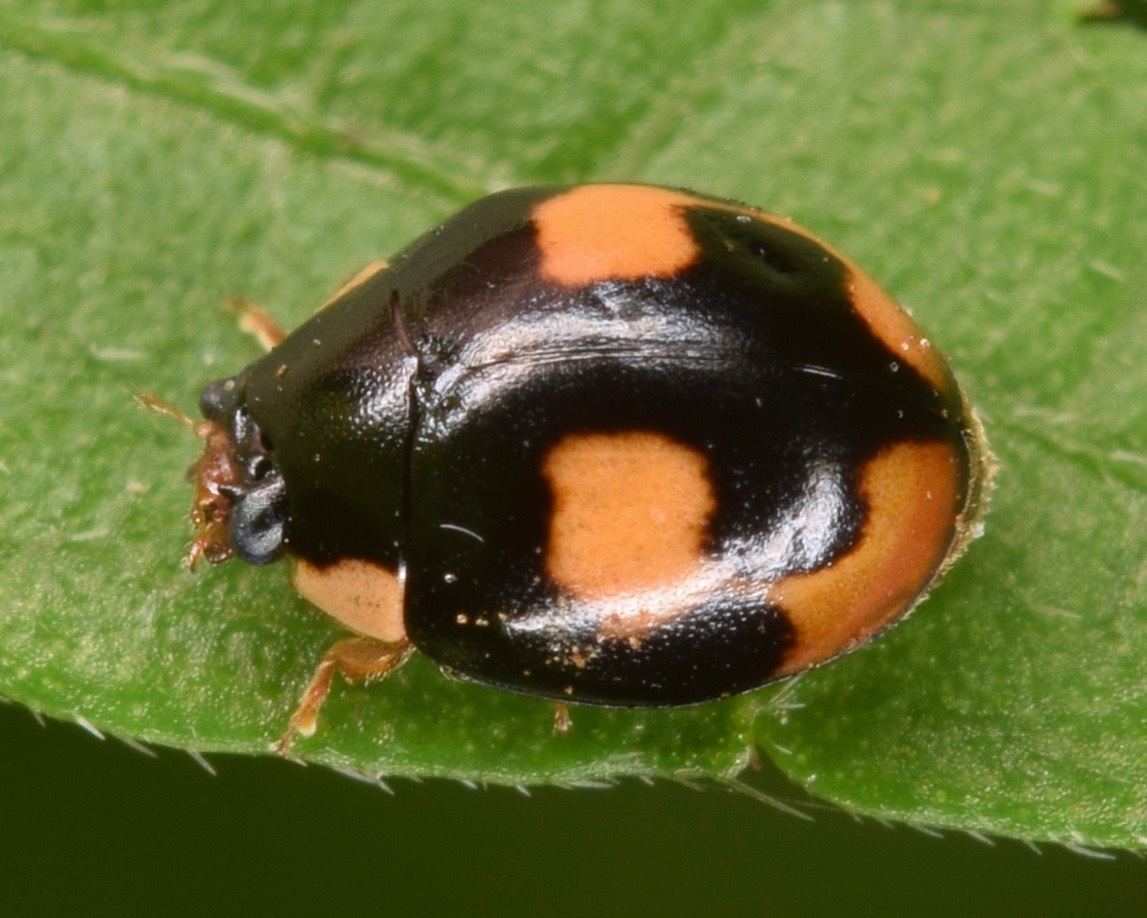

Scientific classification
- Kingdom: Animalia
- Phylum: Arthropoda
- Clade: Pancrustacea
- Class: Insecta
- Order: Coleoptera
- Suborder: Polyphaga
- Infraorder: Cucujiformia
- Family: Coccinellidae
- Genus: Hyperaspis
- Species: H. connectens

Binomial name
- Hyperaspis connectens (Thunberg, 1808)

Synonyms
- Coccinella connectens Thunberg, 1808; Hyperaspis lengi Schaeffer, 1905

= Hyperaspis connectens =

Species of beetle

Hyperaspis connectens, the connected lady, is a species of lady beetle in the family Coccinellidae. It is found from the southern United States south through Central America and the Caribbean Islands to northern South America.

== Description ==
Adults reach a length of about 2.3–3 mm. They have a black body and yellow head. The pronotum is yellow, with the median half black. The elytron has two large yellow spots.
