= Hyperaspis divaricata =

Scientific classification
- Kingdom: Animalia
- Phylum: Arthropoda
- Clade: Pancrustacea
- Class: Insecta
- Order: Coleoptera
- Suborder: Polyphaga
- Infraorder: Cucujiformia
- Family: Coccinellidae
- Genus: Hyperaspis
- Species: H. divaricata

Binomial name
- Hyperaspis divaricata Gordon & González, 2011

Species of beetle

Hyperaspis divaricata is a species of beetle of the family Coccinellidae. It is found in Brazil.

== Description ==
Adults reach a length of about 3.3 mm. They have a black body and a yellow head. The anterior one-fifth and lateral one-fourth of the pronotum is yellow. The elytron is entirely black, except for five pale spots.

== Etymology ==
The species name is derived from Latin divaricatus and refers to the distinctive appearance of the species.
