= Hyperaspis pentaseparata =

Scientific classification
- Kingdom: Animalia
- Phylum: Arthropoda
- Clade: Pancrustacea
- Class: Insecta
- Order: Coleoptera
- Suborder: Polyphaga
- Infraorder: Cucujiformia
- Family: Coccinellidae
- Genus: Hyperaspis
- Species: H. pentaseparata

Binomial name
- Hyperaspis pentaseparata González, 2015

Species of beetle

Hyperaspis pentaseparata is a species of beetle of the family Coccinellidae. It is found in Ecuador.

== Description ==
Adults reach a length of about 2.6 mm. Adults are ivory yellow. There are four spots on the pronotum and five spots on the elytron.
