= Hyperaspis significans =

Scientific classification
- Kingdom: Animalia
- Phylum: Arthropoda
- Clade: Pancrustacea
- Class: Insecta
- Order: Coleoptera
- Suborder: Polyphaga
- Infraorder: Cucujiformia
- Family: Coccinellidae
- Genus: Hyperaspis
- Species: H. significans

Binomial name
- Hyperaspis significans Casey, 1908

Synonyms
- Gordoni significans; Hyperaspis concurrens Casey, 1908

Species of beetle

Hyperaspis significans is a species of beetle of the family Coccinellidae. It is found in North America, where it has been recorded from Utah, Arizona, California and New Mexico.

== Description ==
Adults reach a length of about 2.20–2.65 mm. The pronotum of the males is yellow laterally, while the female pronotum is either narrowly yellow or entirely black except for a pale anterolateral angle. The elytron is uniform black or has a single spot.
