= Hyperaspis dissoluta =

Scientific classification
- Kingdom: Animalia
- Phylum: Arthropoda
- Clade: Pancrustacea
- Class: Insecta
- Order: Coleoptera
- Suborder: Polyphaga
- Infraorder: Cucujiformia
- Family: Coccinellidae
- Genus: Hyperaspis
- Species: H. dissoluta

Binomial name
- Hyperaspis dissoluta Crotch, 1873

Synonyms
- Hyperaspis nupta Casey, 1899; Hyperaspis coloradana Casey, 1908; Hyperaspis nevadica Casey, 1899

Species of beetle

Hyperaspis dissoluta, the dissolute lady beetle, is a species of lady beetles in the family Coccinellidae. It is found in North America, where it has been recorded from California, Arizona, Nevada, Idaho, Oregon, Washington and Utah.

== Description ==
Adults reach a length of about 2.0-2.75 mm (ssp. dissoluta) and about 2.30-3.10 mm (ssp. nevadica). The lateral border of the pronotum of the males is yellow, while the anterior border of ssp. dissoluta is black or yellow. The elytron of ssp. dissoluta has a lateral vitta and an apical spot, while the elytron of ssp. nevadica has one yellow elongate spot.

== Subspecies ==
- Hyperaspis dissoluta dissoluta Crotch, 1873 (California, Idaho, Oregon, Washington)
- Hyperaspis dissoluta nevadica Casey, 1899 (Nevada, Arizona, California, Idaho, Utah, Washington)
