= Hyperaspis inedita =

Scientific classification
- Kingdom: Animalia
- Phylum: Arthropoda
- Clade: Pancrustacea
- Class: Insecta
- Order: Coleoptera
- Suborder: Polyphaga
- Infraorder: Cucujiformia
- Family: Coccinellidae
- Genus: Hyperaspis
- Species: H. inedita

Binomial name
- Hyperaspis inedita Mulsant, 1850

Synonyms
- Hyperaspis regalis Casey, 1899; Hyperaspis nigropennis Blatchley, 1924: Hyperaspis pinorum Casey, 1924; Hyperaspis centralis plagiata Dobzhansky, 1941

Species of beetle

Hyperaspis inedita is a species of lady beetle in the family Coccinellidae. It is found in North America, where it has been recorded from Florida, Georgia, Louisiana, Missouri and North Carolina.

== Description ==
Adults reach a length of about 2.65–3 mm. The anterior margin and lateral area of the pronotum of the males is yellow, while the pronotum of the females has a black anterior margin and a yellow lateral area. There is a red spot on the elytron.
