= Hyperaspis oculaticauda =

Scientific classification
- Kingdom: Animalia
- Phylum: Arthropoda
- Clade: Pancrustacea
- Class: Insecta
- Order: Coleoptera
- Suborder: Polyphaga
- Infraorder: Cucujiformia
- Family: Coccinellidae
- Genus: Hyperaspis
- Species: H. oculaticauda

Binomial name
- Hyperaspis oculaticauda Casey, 1899

Synonyms
- Hyperaspis effeta Casey, 1899; Hyperaspis subdepressa Casey, 1899

Species of beetle

Hyperaspis oculaticauda, the eye-tailed lady beetle, is a species of lady beetle in the family Coccinellidae. It is found in North America, where it has been recorded from California, Nevada and Oregon.

== Description ==
Adults reach a length of about 1.80-2.40 mm. The elytron is black with one apical spot.
