= Hyperaspis c-nigrum =

Scientific classification
- Kingdom: Animalia
- Phylum: Arthropoda
- Clade: Pancrustacea
- Class: Insecta
- Order: Coleoptera
- Suborder: Polyphaga
- Infraorder: Cucujiformia
- Family: Coccinellidae
- Genus: Hyperaspis
- Species: H. c-nigrum

Binomial name
- Hyperaspis c-nigrum Mulsant, 1850

Species of beetle

Hyperaspis c-nigrum is a species of beetle of the family Coccinellidae. It is found in Brazil.

== Description ==
Adults reach a length of about 3.4 mm. They have a yellow body. The pronotum has four triangular brown spots. The elytron has a large brown spot separated from all margins.
