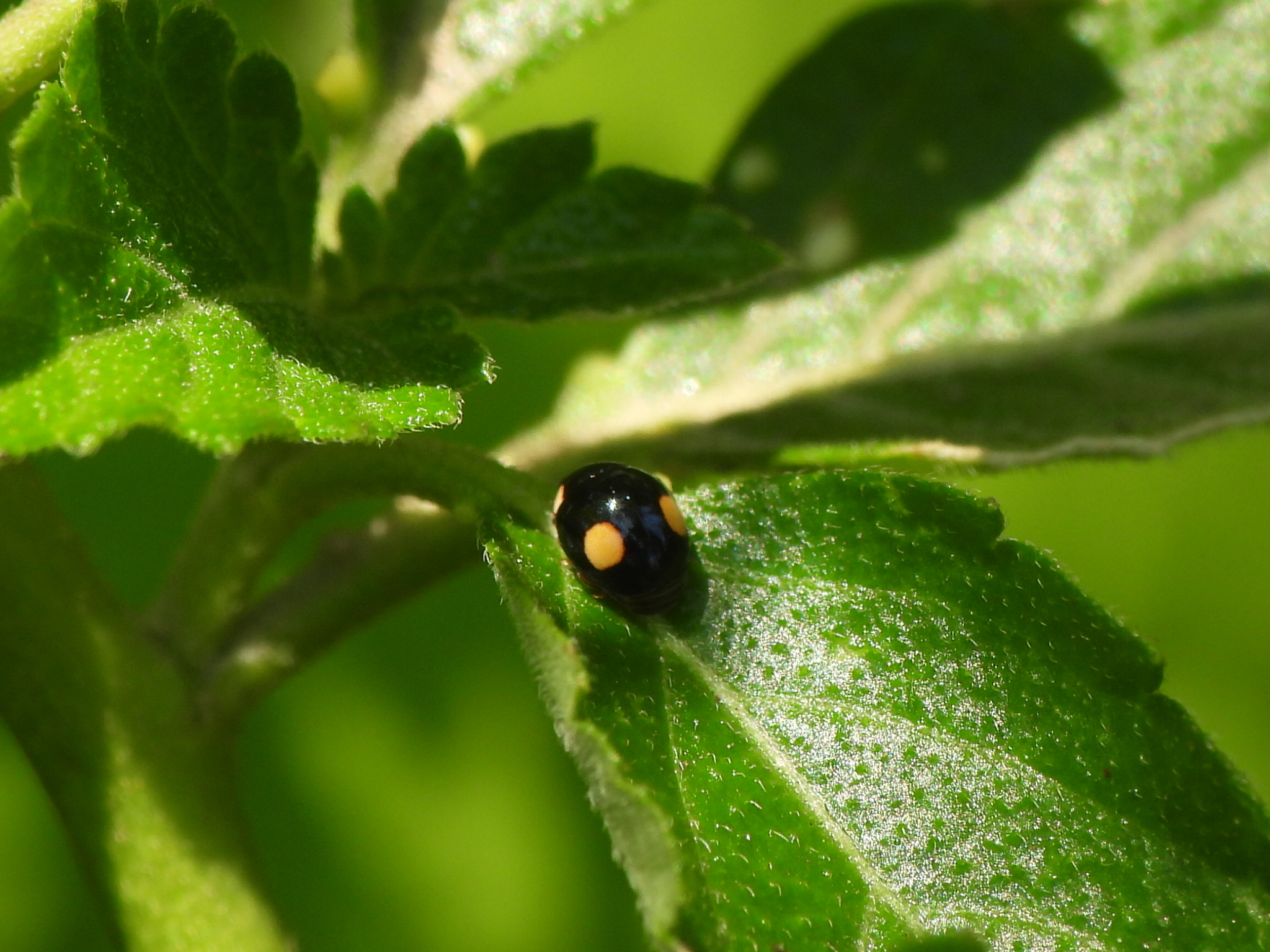

Scientific classification
- Kingdom: Animalia
- Phylum: Arthropoda
- Clade: Pancrustacea
- Class: Insecta
- Order: Coleoptera
- Suborder: Polyphaga
- Infraorder: Cucujiformia
- Family: Coccinellidae
- Genus: Hyperaspis
- Species: H. wickhami

Binomial name
- Hyperaspis wickhami Casey, 1899

Synonyms
- Hyperaspis centralis Mulsant, 1850

= Hyperaspis wickhami =

Species of beetle

Hyperaspis wickhami, or Wickham's lady beetle, is a species of lady beetle in the family Coccinellidae. It is found in North America, where it has been recorded from Texas.

== Description ==
Adults reach a length of about 2.80-3.50 mm. The anterior margin and lateral area of the pronotum of the males is yellow, while the pronotum of the females has a black anterior margin and a yellow lateral area. The elytron has one large yellow or orange spot.
