= Hyperaspis triangulum =

Scientific classification
- Kingdom: Animalia
- Phylum: Arthropoda
- Clade: Pancrustacea
- Class: Insecta
- Order: Coleoptera
- Suborder: Polyphaga
- Infraorder: Cucujiformia
- Family: Coccinellidae
- Genus: Hyperaspis
- Species: H. triangulum

Binomial name
- Hyperaspis triangulum Casey, 1899

Species of beetle

Hyperaspis triangulum, the triad lady beetle, is a species of lady beetle in the family Coccinellidae. It is found in North America, where it has been recorded from Arizona, California and Texas.

== Description ==
Adults reach a length of about 2.0-2.50 mm. The lateral margin of the pronotum is yellow. The elytron has three yellow spots.
