= Hyperaspis limbalis =

Scientific classification
- Kingdom: Animalia
- Phylum: Arthropoda
- Clade: Pancrustacea
- Class: Insecta
- Order: Coleoptera
- Suborder: Polyphaga
- Infraorder: Cucujiformia
- Family: Coccinellidae
- Genus: Hyperaspis
- Species: H. limbalis

Binomial name
- Hyperaspis limbalis Casey, 1899

Species of beetle

Hyperaspis limbalis is a species of beetle in the family Coccinellidae. It is found in North America, where it has been recorded from California.

== Description ==
Adults reach a length of about 1.90-2.50 mm. The elytron is black with a lateral vitta.
