= Hyperaspis binaria =

Scientific classification
- Kingdom: Animalia
- Phylum: Arthropoda
- Clade: Pancrustacea
- Class: Insecta
- Order: Coleoptera
- Suborder: Polyphaga
- Infraorder: Cucujiformia
- Family: Coccinellidae
- Genus: Hyperaspis
- Species: H. binaria

Binomial name
- Hyperaspis binaria Casey, 1924

Synonyms
- Hyperaspis taeniata cruentoides Dobzhansky, 1941

Species of beetle

Hyperaspis binaria is a species of beetle in the family Coccinellidae. It is found in North America, where it has been recorded from North Carolina and Florida.

== Description ==
Adults reach a length of about 2.60-3.0 mm. The lateral and anterior margins of the pronotum of the males are yellow, while the pronotum of the females is black. The elytron sometimes has a yellow spot.
