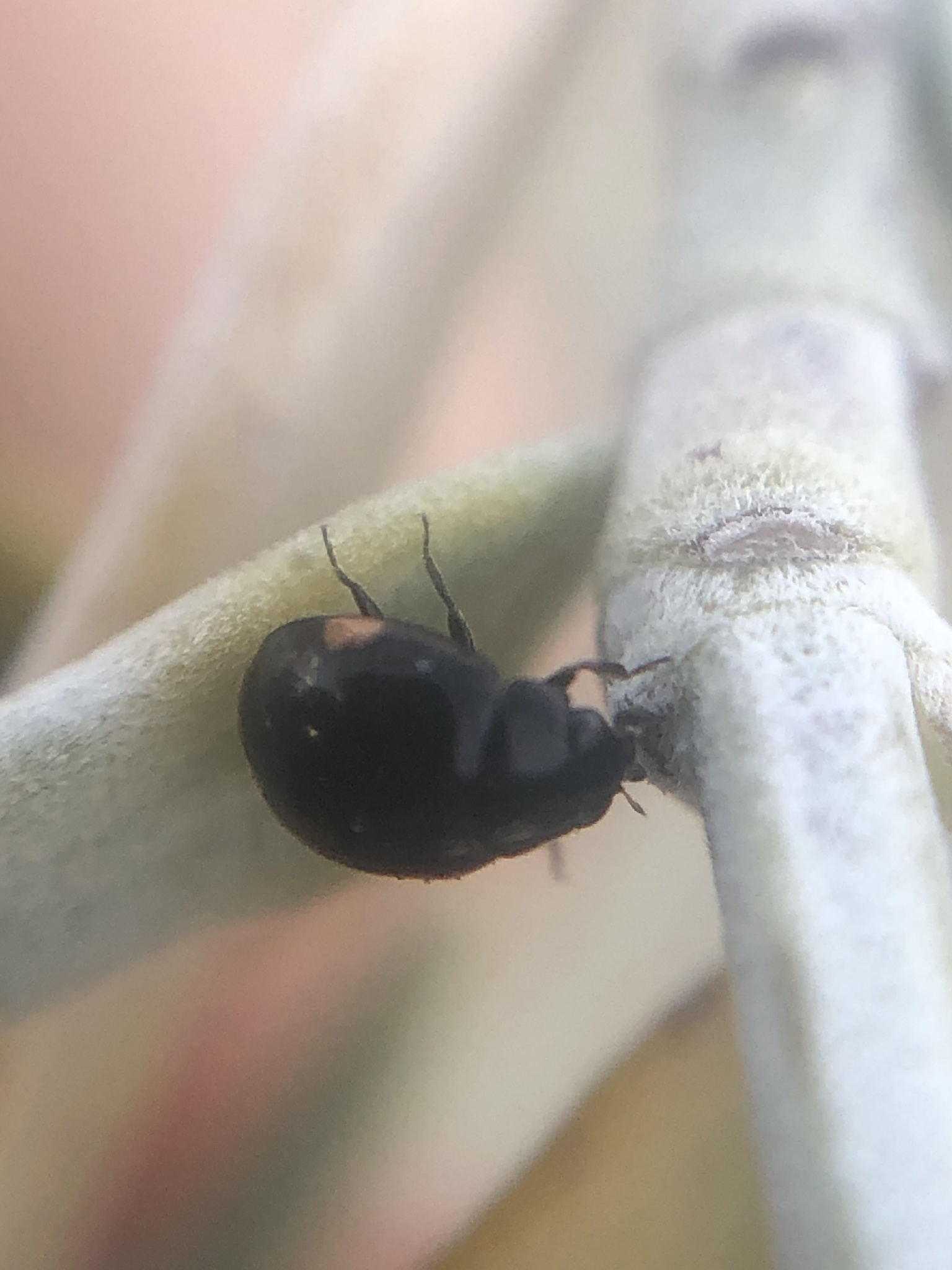

Scientific classification
- Kingdom: Animalia
- Phylum: Arthropoda
- Clade: Pancrustacea
- Class: Insecta
- Order: Coleoptera
- Suborder: Polyphaga
- Infraorder: Cucujiformia
- Family: Coccinellidae
- Genus: Hyperaspis
- Species: H. pleuralis

Binomial name
- Hyperaspis pleuralis Casey, 1899

Synonyms
- Hyperaspis aterrima Casey, 1908; Hyperaspis falli Nunenmacher, 1912; Hyperaspis barri Hatch, 1961

= Hyperaspis pleuralis =

Species of beetle

Hyperaspis pleuralis is a species in the family Coccinellidae ("lady beetles"), in the order Coleoptera ("beetles"). It is found in North America, where it has been recorded from Arizona, California, Nevada, New Mexico, Texas, Oregon and Utah.

== Description ==
Adults reach a length of about 1.95-2.85 mm. The lateral and anterolateral area of the pronotum of the males is yellow. The whole elytron is black, or has a single red or yellow spot.
