= Hyperaspis gemma =

Scientific classification
- Kingdom: Animalia
- Phylum: Arthropoda
- Clade: Pancrustacea
- Class: Insecta
- Order: Coleoptera
- Suborder: Polyphaga
- Infraorder: Cucujiformia
- Family: Coccinellidae
- Genus: Hyperaspis
- Species: H. gemma

Binomial name
- Hyperaspis gemma Casey, 1899

Species of beetle

Hyperaspis gemma is a species of lady beetle in the family Coccinellidae. It is found in North America, where it has been recorded from California, Arizona, New Mexico and Texas.

== Description ==
Adults reach a length of about 2.20-2.80 mm. They have a black head. The pronotum of the males is yellow with a basal black area, while the pronotum of the females is black with a large lateral yellow area. The elytron has three yellow spots.
