= Hyperaspis albopunctata =

Scientific classification
- Kingdom: Animalia
- Phylum: Arthropoda
- Clade: Pancrustacea
- Class: Insecta
- Order: Coleoptera
- Suborder: Polyphaga
- Infraorder: Cucujiformia
- Family: Coccinellidae
- Genus: Hyperaspis
- Species: H. albopunctata

Binomial name
- Hyperaspis albopunctata Crotch, 1874

Species of beetle

Hyperaspis albopunctata is a species of beetle of the family Coccinellidae. It is found in Brazil.

== Description ==
Adults reach a length of about 2.8 mm. They have a black body and yellow head. The pronotum is yellow with a large black spot. The elytron has two pale yellow spots.
