= Hyperaspis osculans =

Scientific classification
- Kingdom: Animalia
- Phylum: Arthropoda
- Clade: Pancrustacea
- Class: Insecta
- Order: Coleoptera
- Suborder: Polyphaga
- Infraorder: Cucujiformia
- Family: Coccinellidae
- Genus: Hyperaspis
- Species: H. osculans

Binomial name
- Hyperaspis osculans Leconte, 1880

Synonyms
- Hyperaspis biornatus Nunenmacher, 1934

Species of beetle

Hyperaspis osculans is a lady beetle species belonging to the family Coccinellidae. It is found in North America, where it has been recorded from California.

== Description ==
Adults reach a length of about 2.50-3.10 mm. The pronotum of the females is black with a reddish brown anterolateral angle or a yellow margin. The elytron has a red or yellow marginal spot
