= Hyperaspis drechseli =

Scientific classification
- Kingdom: Animalia
- Phylum: Arthropoda
- Clade: Pancrustacea
- Class: Insecta
- Order: Coleoptera
- Suborder: Polyphaga
- Infraorder: Cucujiformia
- Family: Coccinellidae
- Genus: Hyperaspis
- Species: H. drechseli

Binomial name
- Hyperaspis drechseli Gordon & González, 2011

Species of beetle

Hyperaspis drechseli is a species of beetle of the family Coccinellidae. It is found in Paraguay.

== Description ==
Adults reach a length of about 2.1 mm. They have a black body and yellow head. The pronotum is yellow with a black marking. The elytron is black with the lateral and apical margins yellow.

== Etymology ==
The species is named for the collector of the holotype.
