= Hyperaspis fastidiosa =

Scientific classification
- Kingdom: Animalia
- Phylum: Arthropoda
- Clade: Pancrustacea
- Class: Insecta
- Order: Coleoptera
- Suborder: Polyphaga
- Infraorder: Cucujiformia
- Family: Coccinellidae
- Genus: Hyperaspis
- Species: H. fastidiosa

Binomial name
- Hyperaspis fastidiosa Casey, 1908

Synonyms
- Hyperaspis fastidiosa septentrionis Dobzhansky, 1941

Species of beetle

Hyperaspis fastidiosa, the fastidious lady beetle, is a species of lady beetle in the family Coccinellidae. It is found in North America, where it has been recorded from Alberta, Arizona, California, Idaho, Nevada, Oregon, Utah, Washington and Wyoming.

== Description ==
Adults reach a length of about 2.10 to 2.80 mm. The pronotum of the males is yellow with a black basal spot, while the pronotum of the females is black with a large yellow lateral area. The elytron has three large yellow spots.
