= Hyperaspis esclavium =

Scientific classification
- Kingdom: Animalia
- Phylum: Arthropoda
- Clade: Pancrustacea
- Class: Insecta
- Order: Coleoptera
- Suborder: Polyphaga
- Infraorder: Cucujiformia
- Family: Coccinellidae
- Genus: Hyperaspis
- Species: H. esclavium

Binomial name
- Hyperaspis esclavium Dobzhansky, 1941

Species of beetle

Hyperaspis esclavium is a species of beetle in the family Coccinellidae. It is found in North America, where it has been recorded from Mississippi.

== Description ==
Adults reach a length of about 2.20-2.60 mm. The anterior margin and lateral area of the pronotum of the males is yellow, while the pronotum of the females has a black anterior margin and a large yellow lateral area. The elytron has four yellow spots.
