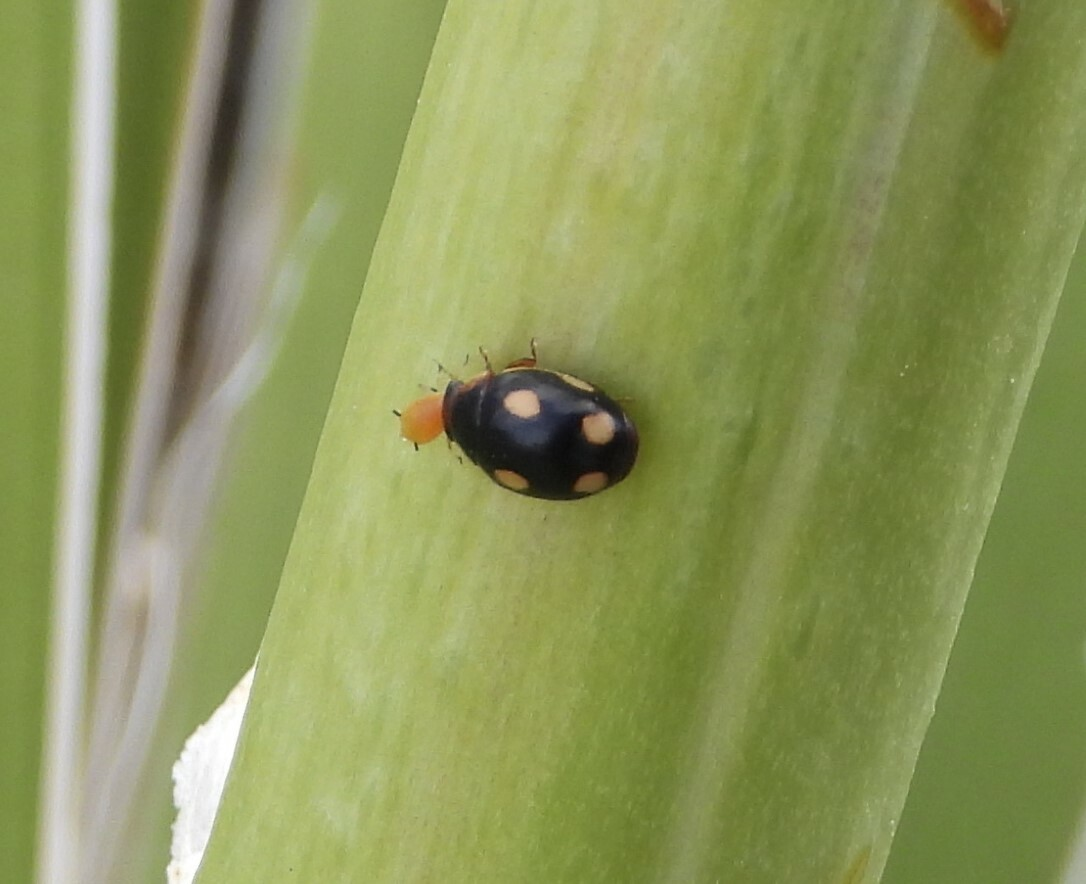

Scientific classification
- Kingdom: Animalia
- Phylum: Arthropoda
- Clade: Pancrustacea
- Class: Insecta
- Order: Coleoptera
- Suborder: Polyphaga
- Infraorder: Cucujiformia
- Family: Coccinellidae
- Genus: Hyperaspis
- Species: H. lugubris

Binomial name
- Hyperaspis lugubris (Randall, 1838)

Synonyms
- Coccinella lugubris Randall, 1838; Hyperaspis jucunda LeConte, 1852 (preocc.); Hyperaspis lecontii Crotch, 1874; Hyperaspis separata Casey, 1924

= Hyperaspis lugubris =

Species of beetle

Hyperaspis lugubris, the lugubrious lady beetle, is a species of lady beetle in the family Coccinellidae. It is found in North America, where it has been recorded from Colorado, Kansas, Minnesota, Nebraska, New York, North Dakota and Pennsylvania.

== Description ==
Adults reach a length of about 2.40-3.30 mm. The pronotum of the males is reddish yellow, often with a black or darkened area. Females have a yellow head and the pronotum is black with a yellow lateral margin. The elytron has three spots.
