= Hyperaspis circumclusa =

Scientific classification
- Kingdom: Animalia
- Phylum: Arthropoda
- Clade: Pancrustacea
- Class: Insecta
- Order: Coleoptera
- Suborder: Polyphaga
- Infraorder: Cucujiformia
- Family: Coccinellidae
- Genus: Hyperaspis
- Species: H. circumclusa

Binomial name
- Hyperaspis circumclusa Gordon & Canepari, 2008

Species of beetle

Hyperaspis circumclusa is a species of beetle of the family Coccinellidae. It is found in Brazil.

== Description ==
Adults reach a length of about 2.2 mm. They have a reddish yellow body and yellow head. The pronotum is dark brown, with the lateral one-fifth yellow. The lateral one-fourth of the pronotum is also yellow. The elytron is reddish yellow, but the lateral and apical margins have a wide yellow border. The sutural margin is dark brown.

== Etymology ==
The species is named for the lateral yellow border encircling nearly the entire body except the head.
