= Hyperaspis filiola =

Scientific classification
- Kingdom: Animalia
- Phylum: Arthropoda
- Clade: Pancrustacea
- Class: Insecta
- Order: Coleoptera
- Suborder: Polyphaga
- Infraorder: Cucujiformia
- Family: Coccinellidae
- Genus: Hyperaspis
- Species: H. filiola

Binomial name
- Hyperaspis filiola Casey, 1908

Species of beetle

Hyperaspis filiola is a species of beetle in the family Coccinellidae. It is found in North America, where it has been recorded from Arizona.

== Description ==
Adults reach a length of about 2.20 mm. The pronotum of the females is black and the elytron has a marginal vitta, as well as an oval discal spot.
