= Hyperaspis paludicola =

Scientific classification
- Kingdom: Animalia
- Phylum: Arthropoda
- Clade: Pancrustacea
- Class: Insecta
- Order: Coleoptera
- Suborder: Polyphaga
- Infraorder: Cucujiformia
- Family: Coccinellidae
- Genus: Hyperaspis
- Species: H. paludicola

Binomial name
- Hyperaspis paludicola Schwarz, 1878

Species of beetle

Hyperaspis paludicola, the swamp lady beetle, is a species of lady beetle in the family Coccinellidae. It is found in North America, where it has been recorded from Alberta, Florida, Georgia and Mississippi and South Carolina.

== Description ==
Adults reach a length of about 1.70-2.10 mm. The elytron is black with a lateral vitta and a discal spot.
