= Hyperaspis prolata =

Scientific classification
- Kingdom: Animalia
- Phylum: Arthropoda
- Clade: Pancrustacea
- Class: Insecta
- Order: Coleoptera
- Suborder: Polyphaga
- Infraorder: Cucujiformia
- Family: Coccinellidae
- Genus: Hyperaspis
- Species: H. prolata

Binomial name
- Hyperaspis prolata Gordon & Canepari, 2008

Species of beetle

Hyperaspis prolata is a species of beetle of the family Coccinellidae. It is found in Argentina and Brazil.

== Description ==
Adults reach a length of about 2.6–2.8 mm. They have a black body and yellow head. The pronotum is yellow with a median black spot. The elytron has a yellow lateral border in the basal two-thirds, a round discal spot and a slender comma shaped apical spot.

== Etymology ==
The species name is derived from Latin prolatus (meaning elongated) and refers to the long, slender body form.
