= Hyperaspis cleida =

Scientific classification
- Kingdom: Animalia
- Phylum: Arthropoda
- Clade: Pancrustacea
- Class: Insecta
- Order: Coleoptera
- Suborder: Polyphaga
- Infraorder: Cucujiformia
- Family: Coccinellidae
- Genus: Hyperaspis
- Species: H. cleida

Binomial name
- Hyperaspis cleida Mulsant, 1850

Species of beetle

Hyperaspis cleida is a species of beetle of the family Coccinellidae. It is found in Brazil.

== Description ==
Adults reach a length of about 2.6 mm. They have a black body and yellow head. The pronotum is black, except for the anterior margin and the lateral one-fourth, which are yellow. The elytron has four yellow spots.
