= Hyperaspis simulatrix =

Scientific classification
- Kingdom: Animalia
- Phylum: Arthropoda
- Clade: Pancrustacea
- Class: Insecta
- Order: Coleoptera
- Suborder: Polyphaga
- Infraorder: Cucujiformia
- Family: Coccinellidae
- Genus: Hyperaspis
- Species: H. simulatrix

Binomial name
- Hyperaspis simulatrix Dobzhansky, 1941

Species of beetle

Hyperaspis simulatrix is a species of beetle in the family Coccinellidae. It is found in North America, where it has been recorded from Idaho, Oregon and Washington.

== Description ==
Adults reach a length of about 2.20-2.70 mm. The elytron has a yellow marginal vitta and an oval apical spot and elongate discal spot.
