= Hyperaspis gemina =

Scientific classification
- Kingdom: Animalia
- Phylum: Arthropoda
- Clade: Pancrustacea
- Class: Insecta
- Order: Coleoptera
- Suborder: Polyphaga
- Infraorder: Cucujiformia
- Family: Coccinellidae
- Genus: Hyperaspis
- Species: H. gemina

Binomial name
- Hyperaspis gemina LeConte, 1880

Species of beetle

Hyperaspis gemina, the twin-spotted lady beetle, is a species of lady beetle in the family Coccinellidae. It is found in North America, where it has been recorded from Georgia, North Carolina, South Carolina and Virginia.

== Description ==
Adults reach a length of about 2.80–4 mm. They have a yellow head yellow and the pronotum has yellow lateral area. The elytron has two yellow spots.
