= Hyperaspis transversoguttata =

Scientific classification
- Kingdom: Animalia
- Phylum: Arthropoda
- Clade: Pancrustacea
- Class: Insecta
- Order: Coleoptera
- Suborder: Polyphaga
- Infraorder: Cucujiformia
- Family: Coccinellidae
- Genus: Hyperaspis
- Species: H. transversoguttata

Binomial name
- Hyperaspis transversoguttata Weise, 1878

Synonyms
- Oxynychus alexandrae Weise 1890

Species of beetle

Hyperaspis transversoguttata is a species of lady beetle native to Turkey and the Middle East. Specimens have been collected from tamarisks.
