= Hyperaspis dispar =

Scientific classification
- Kingdom: Animalia
- Phylum: Arthropoda
- Clade: Pancrustacea
- Class: Insecta
- Order: Coleoptera
- Suborder: Polyphaga
- Infraorder: Cucujiformia
- Family: Coccinellidae
- Genus: Hyperaspis
- Species: H. dispar

Binomial name
- Hyperaspis dispar Gordon & Canepari, 2008

Species of beetle

Hyperaspis dispar is a species of beetle of the family Coccinellidae. It is found in Brazil.

== Description ==
Adults reach a length of about 3.4 mm. They have a yellow body. The pronotum has five dark brown spots. The elytron has five dark brown spots and the sutural margin is also dark brown.

== Etymology ==
The species name is derived from Latin dispar (meaning unlike or dissimilar) and refers to the distinctive color pattern.
