= Hyperaspis nigrosuturalis =

Scientific classification
- Kingdom: Animalia
- Phylum: Arthropoda
- Clade: Pancrustacea
- Class: Insecta
- Order: Coleoptera
- Suborder: Polyphaga
- Infraorder: Cucujiformia
- Family: Coccinellidae
- Genus: Hyperaspis
- Species: H. nigrosuturalis

Binomial name
- Hyperaspis nigrosuturalis Blatchley, 1918

Species of beetle

Hyperaspis nigrosuturalis is a species of lady beetle in the family Coccinellidae. It is found in North America, where it has been recorded from Florida.

== Description ==
Adults reach a length of about 3.40 mm. Males have a yellow head, while it is black in females. The pronotum of the males has a yellow lateral margin, while the pronotum of the females is black. The elytron is red with black margins.
