= Hyperaspis pistillata =

Scientific classification
- Kingdom: Animalia
- Phylum: Arthropoda
- Clade: Pancrustacea
- Class: Insecta
- Order: Coleoptera
- Suborder: Polyphaga
- Infraorder: Cucujiformia
- Family: Coccinellidae
- Genus: Hyperaspis
- Species: H. pistillata

Binomial name
- Hyperaspis pistillata Watson, 1969

Species of beetle

Hyperaspis pistillata is a species of lady beetle in the family Coccinellidae. It is found in North America, where it has been recorded from Massachusetts to Florida and Louisiana.

== Description ==
Adults reach a length of about 2.75-4.0 mm. The pronotum of the males has yellow anterior and lateral margins, while the pronotum of the females is black. The elytron has one or two yellow or red spots.
