= Hyperaspis major =

Scientific classification
- Kingdom: Animalia
- Phylum: Arthropoda
- Clade: Pancrustacea
- Class: Insecta
- Order: Coleoptera
- Suborder: Polyphaga
- Infraorder: Cucujiformia
- Family: Coccinellidae
- Genus: Hyperaspis
- Species: H. major

Binomial name
- Hyperaspis major Dobzhansky, 1941

Synonyms
- Hyperaspis bicentralis major Dobzhansky, 1941; Hyperaspis congeminata Watson, 1969

Species of beetle

Hyperaspis major is a species of beetle of the family Coccinellidae. It is found in North America, where it has been recorded from Indiana, Illinois and Kansas.

== Description ==
Adults reach a length of about 3.50–3.70 mm. The anterior margin and lateral area of the pronotum of the males is yellow, while the pronotum of the females is black. The elytron has one yellow or red discal spot.
