= Hyperaspis esmeraldas =

Scientific classification
- Kingdom: Animalia
- Phylum: Arthropoda
- Clade: Pancrustacea
- Class: Insecta
- Order: Coleoptera
- Suborder: Polyphaga
- Infraorder: Cucujiformia
- Family: Coccinellidae
- Genus: Hyperaspis
- Species: H. esmeraldas

Binomial name
- Hyperaspis esmeraldas Gordon & González, 2011

Species of beetle

Hyperaspis esmeraldas is a species of beetle of the family Coccinellidae. It is found in Ecuador and Peru.

== Description ==
Adults reach a length of about 2.5–2.6 mm. They have a black body and yellow head. The pronotum has a black marking. The elytron has a large yellow spot.

== Etymology ==
The species is named for Esmeraldas Province, Ecuador, where the holotype was collected.
