= Hyperaspis joannae =

Scientific classification
- Kingdom: Animalia
- Phylum: Arthropoda
- Clade: Pancrustacea
- Class: Insecta
- Order: Coleoptera
- Suborder: Polyphaga
- Infraorder: Cucujiformia
- Family: Coccinellidae
- Genus: Hyperaspis
- Species: H. joannae

Binomial name
- Hyperaspis joannae Gordon & Canepari, 2008

Species of beetle

Hyperaspis joannae is a species of beetle of the family Coccinellidae. It is found in Colombia.

== Description ==
Adults reach a length of about 2.5 mm. They have a black body and yellow head. The pronotum is yellow with a large black spot. The elytron has a large reddish yellow spot, a small triangular spot, a small oval spot and a transverse subapical spot.

== Etymology ==
The species is named for JoAnne Gordon, who assisted the authors with the genus revision.
