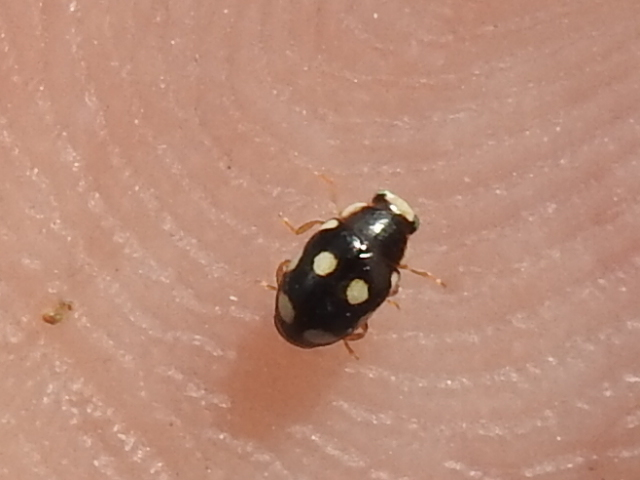

Scientific classification
- Kingdom: Animalia
- Phylum: Arthropoda
- Clade: Pancrustacea
- Class: Insecta
- Order: Coleoptera
- Suborder: Polyphaga
- Infraorder: Cucujiformia
- Family: Coccinellidae
- Genus: Hyperaspis
- Species: H. punctata

Binomial name
- Hyperaspis punctata LeConte, 1880

= Hyperaspis punctata =

Species of beetle

Hyperaspis punctata is a species of lady beetle in the family Coccinellidae. It is found in North America, where it has been recorded from Texas.

== Description ==
Adults reach a length of about 1.70-2.30 mm. The elytron is black with a discal spot, an apical spot and a vitta on the lateral margin.
