= Hyperaspis cruenta =

Scientific classification
- Kingdom: Animalia
- Phylum: Arthropoda
- Clade: Pancrustacea
- Class: Insecta
- Order: Coleoptera
- Suborder: Polyphaga
- Infraorder: Cucujiformia
- Family: Coccinellidae
- Genus: Hyperaspis
- Species: H. cruenta

Binomial name
- Hyperaspis cruenta LeConte, 1880

Synonyms
- Hyperaspis taeniata rufescens Dobzhansky, 1941

Species of beetle

Hyperaspis cruenta, the bloody lady beetle, is a species of lady beetle in the family Coccinellidae. It is found in North America, where it has been recorded from Texas and New Mexico.

== Description ==
Adults reach a length of about 2.50-2.65 mm. The pronotum of the males is reddish yellow laterally, while the pronotum of the females is reddish brown laterally. The elytron has one marginal spot.
