= Hyperaspis operaria =

Scientific classification
- Kingdom: Animalia
- Phylum: Arthropoda
- Clade: Pancrustacea
- Class: Insecta
- Order: Coleoptera
- Suborder: Polyphaga
- Infraorder: Cucujiformia
- Family: Coccinellidae
- Genus: Hyperaspis
- Species: H. operaria

Binomial name
- Hyperaspis operaria (Mulsant, 1853)

Synonyms
- Cleothera operaria Mulsant, 1853; Hyperaspis insignis Crotch, 1874; Hyperaspis communalis Brèthes, 1925

Species of beetle

Hyperaspis operaria is a species of beetle of the family Coccinellidae. It is found in Brazil.

== Description ==
Adults reach a length of about 2.8-3.3 mm. They have a yellow body. The pronotum has a large black spot. The basal, lateral and apical borders of the elytron are black and there is one large black spot.
