= Hyperaspis abscondita =

Scientific classification
- Kingdom: Animalia
- Phylum: Arthropoda
- Clade: Pancrustacea
- Class: Insecta
- Order: Coleoptera
- Suborder: Polyphaga
- Infraorder: Cucujiformia
- Family: Coccinellidae
- Genus: Hyperaspis
- Species: H. abscondita

Binomial name
- Hyperaspis abscondita González & Gordon, 2009

Species of beetle

Hyperaspis abscondita is a species of beetle of the family Coccinellidae. It is found in Argentina.

== Description ==
Adults reach a length of about 2.9–3 mm. Adults are yellow brown. The pronotum is light yellow with a brownish black median border and pale brown spots. The elytron is blackish brown with a yellow lateral margin.

== Etymology ==
The species name is derived from Latin conditus (meaning hide, concealed) and refers to the lack of specimens in collections.
