= Hyperaspis lindae =

Scientific classification
- Kingdom: Animalia
- Phylum: Arthropoda
- Clade: Pancrustacea
- Class: Insecta
- Order: Coleoptera
- Suborder: Polyphaga
- Infraorder: Cucujiformia
- Family: Coccinellidae
- Genus: Hyperaspis
- Species: H. lindae

Binomial name
- Hyperaspis lindae Gordon & Canepari, 2008

Species of beetle

Hyperaspis lindae is a species of beetle of the family Coccinellidae. It is found in Colombia.

== Description ==
Adults reach a length of about 2.6 mm. They have a yellow body. The pronotum has a large black median vitta. The elytron is red with the basal and apical margins black, as well as a short black vitta, a small round black spot and one small oval black spot.

== Etymology ==
The species is named for Linda Lawrence, illustrator for the Systematic Entomology Laboratory, USDA, Washington, who has provided illustrations of lady beetles for many publications.
