= Hyperaspis consimilis =

Scientific classification
- Kingdom: Animalia
- Phylum: Arthropoda
- Clade: Pancrustacea
- Class: Insecta
- Order: Coleoptera
- Suborder: Polyphaga
- Infraorder: Cucujiformia
- Family: Coccinellidae
- Genus: Hyperaspis
- Species: H. consimilis

Binomial name
- Hyperaspis consimilis LeConte, 1852

Synonyms
- Hyperaspis disconotata canadensis Dobzhansky, 1941

Species of beetle

Hyperaspis consimilis is a species of lady beetle in the family Coccinellidae. It is found in North America, where it has been recorded from Alberta, Quebec and New York.

== Description ==
Adults reach a length of about 2.30-2.70 mm. The elytron has a lateral vitta and a median and a basal spot.
