= Hyperaspis matronata =

Scientific classification
- Kingdom: Animalia
- Phylum: Arthropoda
- Clade: Pancrustacea
- Class: Insecta
- Order: Coleoptera
- Suborder: Polyphaga
- Infraorder: Cucujiformia
- Family: Coccinellidae
- Genus: Hyperaspis
- Species: H. matronata

Binomial name
- Hyperaspis matronata (Mulsant, 1853)

Synonyms
- Cleothera matronata Mulsant, 1853; Cleothera cordifera Weise, 1895

Species of beetle

Hyperaspis matronata is a species of beetle of the family Coccinellidae. It is found in southeastern South America (including Argentina, Brazil, Bolivia and Paraguay).

== Description ==
Adults reach a length of about 2.4–3.0 mm. They have a yellow body. The pronotum has a large black spot. The elytron has three black spots.
