= Hyperaspis revocans =

Scientific classification
- Kingdom: Animalia
- Phylum: Arthropoda
- Clade: Pancrustacea
- Class: Insecta
- Order: Coleoptera
- Suborder: Polyphaga
- Infraorder: Cucujiformia
- Family: Coccinellidae
- Genus: Hyperaspis
- Species: H. revocans

Binomial name
- Hyperaspis revocans Casey, 1908

Synonyms
- Hyeraspis revocans occidentalis Dobzhansky, 1941

Species of beetle

Hyperaspis revocans is a species of beetle in the family Coccinellidae. It is found in North America, where it has been recorded from Arizona, Texas, New Mexico and Utah.

== Description ==
Adults reach a length of about 2.0-2.40 mm. They have a yellow head. The pronotum of the males is yellow with a large black spot, while the pronotum of the females is black with a yellow anterior and lateral margin. The colour pattern of the elytron is variable.
