= Hyperaspis quadrivittata =

Scientific classification
- Kingdom: Animalia
- Phylum: Arthropoda
- Clade: Pancrustacea
- Class: Insecta
- Order: Coleoptera
- Suborder: Polyphaga
- Infraorder: Cucujiformia
- Family: Coccinellidae
- Genus: Hyperaspis
- Species: H. quadrivittata

Binomial name
- Hyperaspis quadrivittata LeConte, 1852

Synonyms
- Hyperaspis tetraneura Casey, 1908

Species of beetle

Hyperaspis quadrivittata, also known as the four-streaked lady beetle, is a species of lady beetle in the family Coccinellidae. It is found in North America, where it has been recorded from Alberta, Arizona, Idaho, North Dakota, Oregon, Wyoming and Washington.

Adults are small (2.0-2.7mm). The elytron is black with vittae as described for Hyperaspis brunnescens.
