= Hyperaspis haematosticta =

Scientific classification
- Kingdom: Animalia
- Phylum: Arthropoda
- Clade: Pancrustacea
- Class: Insecta
- Order: Coleoptera
- Suborder: Polyphaga
- Infraorder: Cucujiformia
- Family: Coccinellidae
- Genus: Hyperaspis
- Species: H. haematosticta

Binomial name
- Hyperaspis haematosticta Fall, 1907

Species of beetle

Hyperaspis haematosticta is a species of lady beetle in the family Coccinellidae. It is found in North America, where it has been recorded from New Mexico and Arizona.

== Description ==
Adults reach a length of about 2.70-3.80 mm. The colour pattern of the pronotum is similar to that of Hyperaspis binotata. The elytron has a red discal spot and sometimes also an apical spot.
