= Hyperaspis mimica =

Scientific classification
- Kingdom: Animalia
- Phylum: Arthropoda
- Clade: Pancrustacea
- Class: Insecta
- Order: Coleoptera
- Suborder: Polyphaga
- Infraorder: Cucujiformia
- Family: Coccinellidae
- Genus: Hyperaspis
- Species: H. mimica

Binomial name
- Hyperaspis mimica Gordon & Canepari, 2008

Species of beetle

Hyperaspis mimica is a species of beetle in the family Coccinellidae. It is found in South America.

== Description ==
Adults reach a length of about 2.4 mm. They have a black body and yellow head. The lateral one-fourth of the pronotum is yellow. The elytron has a small yellow subapical spot.

== Etymology ==
The species name is derived from Latin mimus (meaning imitate) and refers to the resemblance in color pattern to Hyperaspis apicalis and Hyperaspis delicata.
