= Hyperaspis aemulator =

Scientific classification
- Kingdom: Animalia
- Phylum: Arthropoda
- Clade: Pancrustacea
- Class: Insecta
- Order: Coleoptera
- Suborder: Polyphaga
- Infraorder: Cucujiformia
- Family: Coccinellidae
- Genus: Hyperaspis
- Species: H. aemulator

Binomial name
- Hyperaspis aemulator Casey, 1908

Species of beetle

Hyperaspis aemulator is a species of lady beetle in the family Coccinellidae. It is found in North America, where it has been recorded from Arizona.

== Description ==
Adults reach a length of about 2.40-2.80 mm. The colour pattern is similar to that of Hyperaspis medialis.
