= Hyperaspis amati =

Scientific classification
- Kingdom: Animalia
- Phylum: Arthropoda
- Clade: Pancrustacea
- Class: Insecta
- Order: Coleoptera
- Suborder: Polyphaga
- Infraorder: Cucujiformia
- Family: Coccinellidae
- Genus: Hyperaspis
- Species: H. amati

Binomial name
- Hyperaspis amati González, 2024

Synonyms
- Hyperaspis mimica Gordon & González, 2011 (preocc.)

Species of beetle

Hyperaspis amati is a species of beetle of the family Coccinellidae. It is found in Colombia.

== Description ==
Adults reach a length of about 2.4 mm. They have a black body and yellow head. The pronotum has a black marking. The elytron is black with four yellow spots.

== Etymology ==
The species name is derived from Latin mimus (meaning to imitate) and refers to the close resemblance to Tenuisvalvae bisquinquepustulata.
