= Hyperaspis pseudodonzeli =

Scientific classification
- Kingdom: Animalia
- Phylum: Arthropoda
- Clade: Pancrustacea
- Class: Insecta
- Order: Coleoptera
- Suborder: Polyphaga
- Infraorder: Cucujiformia
- Family: Coccinellidae
- Genus: Hyperaspis
- Species: H. pseudodonzeli

Binomial name
- Hyperaspis pseudodonzeli Gordon & Canepari, 2008

Species of beetle

Hyperaspis pseudodonzeli is a species of beetle of the family Coccinellidae. It is found in Venezuela, Trinidad, Curaçao, Colombia and Guyana.

== Description ==
Adults reach a length of about 2.3–2.5 mm. They have a dark brown body and yellow head. The pronotum is yellow with four pale brown indistinct spots. The elytron has three large yellow spots.

== Etymology ==
The species name refers to the resemblance to Hyperaspis donzeli.
