= Hyperaspis leachi =

Scientific classification
- Kingdom: Animalia
- Phylum: Arthropoda
- Clade: Pancrustacea
- Class: Insecta
- Order: Coleoptera
- Suborder: Polyphaga
- Infraorder: Cucujiformia
- Family: Coccinellidae
- Genus: Hyperaspis
- Species: H. leachi

Binomial name
- Hyperaspis leachi Nunenmacher, 1934

Species of beetle

Hyperaspis leachi is a species of lady beetle in the family Coccinellidae. It is found in North America, where it has been recorded from California.

== Description ==
Adults reach a length of about 2.40-3.10 mm. Adults are similar to Hyperaspis jovialis, but the pronotum of the males is black with a yellow lateral and apical margin. The female pronotum is black with a yellow lateral margin. The elytron has a large orange spot.
