= Hyperaspis schaefferi =

Scientific classification
- Kingdom: Animalia
- Phylum: Arthropoda
- Clade: Pancrustacea
- Class: Insecta
- Order: Coleoptera
- Suborder: Polyphaga
- Infraorder: Cucujiformia
- Family: Coccinellidae
- Genus: Hyperaspis
- Species: H. schaefferi

Binomial name
- Hyperaspis schaefferi Gordon, 1985

Species of beetle

Hyperaspis schaefferi, known generally as the Schaeffer's lady beetle, is a species of lady beetles in the family Coccinellidae. It is found in North America, where it has been recorded from Texas.

== Description ==
Adults reach a length of about 2.20-2.75 mm. Adults are similar to Hyperaspis caseyi, but the lateral vitta on the elytron is incomplete.
