= Hyperaspis rivularis =

Scientific classification
- Kingdom: Animalia
- Phylum: Arthropoda
- Clade: Pancrustacea
- Class: Insecta
- Order: Coleoptera
- Suborder: Polyphaga
- Infraorder: Cucujiformia
- Family: Coccinellidae
- Genus: Hyperaspis
- Species: H. rivularis

Binomial name
- Hyperaspis rivularis Dobzhansky, 1941

Species of beetle

Hyperaspis rivularis is a species of beetle of the family Coccinellidae. It is found in North America, where it has been recorded from Kentucky, Illinois and Kentucky.

== Description ==
Adults reach a length of about 2.40–3.00 mm. Adults are similar to Hyperaspis proba, but the elytron has one yellow or orange discal spot.
