= Hyperaspis chapini (2008) =

Scientific classification
- Kingdom: Animalia
- Phylum: Arthropoda
- Clade: Pancrustacea
- Class: Insecta
- Order: Coleoptera
- Suborder: Polyphaga
- Infraorder: Cucujiformia
- Family: Coccinellidae
- Genus: Hyperaspis
- Species: H. chapini

Binomial name
- Hyperaspis chapini Gordon & Canepari, 2008

Species of beetle

Hyperaspis chapini is a species of beetle of the family Coccinellidae. It is found in Trinidad.

== Description ==
Adults reach a length of about 2.1-2.4 mm. They have a black body and a yellow head. The pronotum is yellow with a large black spot. The elytron is dark brown with one reddish yellow spot.

== Etymology ==
The species is named for Edward A. Chapin, who did systematic research on Coccinellidae.

== Taxonomy ==
This is not Hyperaspis chapini as described by Dobzhansky in 1941. Hence, the name is preoccupied and needs to be replaced.
