= Hyperaspis excelsa =

Scientific classification
- Kingdom: Animalia
- Phylum: Arthropoda
- Clade: Pancrustacea
- Class: Insecta
- Order: Coleoptera
- Suborder: Polyphaga
- Infraorder: Cucujiformia
- Family: Coccinellidae
- Genus: Hyperaspis
- Species: H. excelsa

Binomial name
- Hyperaspis excelsa Fall, 1901

Species of beetle

Hyperaspis excelsa is a species of beetle of the family Coccinellidae. It is found in North America, where it has been recorded from California.

== Description ==
Adults reach a length of about 3.40–4.20 mm. Adults are similar to Hyperaspis lateralis, but the elytron ha a subhumeral spot connected to a large discal spot.
