= Hyperaspis aemulata =

Scientific classification
- Kingdom: Animalia
- Phylum: Arthropoda
- Clade: Pancrustacea
- Class: Insecta
- Order: Coleoptera
- Suborder: Polyphaga
- Infraorder: Cucujiformia
- Family: Coccinellidae
- Genus: Hyperaspis
- Species: H. aemulata

Binomial name
- Hyperaspis aemulata Gordon & Canepari, 2008

Species of beetle

Hyperaspis aemulata is a species of beetle of the family Coccinellidae. It is found in Venezuela.

== Description ==
Adults reach a length of about 3.4 mm. They have a yellow body. The pronotum has a large black basomedian spot. The elytron has five dark brown spots.

== Etymology ==
The species name is derived from Latin aemulor (meaning to emulate) and refers to the resemblance to other species of Hyperaspidini.
