= Hyperaspidini =

Scientific classification
- Kingdom: Animalia
- Phylum: Arthropoda
- Clade: Pancrustacea
- Class: Insecta
- Order: Coleoptera
- Suborder: Polyphaga
- Infraorder: Cucujiformia
- Family: Coccinellidae
- Subfamily: Coccinellinae
- Tribe: Hyperaspidini; Mulsant, 1846

Synonyms
- Selvadiini Gordon, 1985

Tribe of beetles

The Hyperaspidini are a tribe of insects within the family Coccinellidae.

== Genera ==
- Blaisdelliana
- Clavatus
- Clypeaspis
- Diazonema
- Erratodiomus
- Helesius
- Hyperaspidius
- Hyperaspis
- Magnodiomus
- Menoscelis
- Mimoscymnus
- Peruaspis
- Planorbata
- Prognataspis
- Selvadius
- Tenuisvalvae
- Thalassa

== Genera placed in either Hyperaspidini or Brachiacanthini ==
- Brachiacantha
- Cleothera
- Cyrea
- Dilatitibialis
- Hinda
- Serratitibia
- Tiphysa

== Systematics ==
Hyperaspidini has long been considered a tribe within the subfamily Hyperaspidinae. However, later research resulted in a new classification of the Coccinellidae, with only two (and later three) subfamilies. Under that system, the Hyperaspidini belong to the subfamily Coccinellinae. The tribes Brachiacanthini and Selvadiini were both considered synonyms of Hyperaspidini, however, later authors have retained the Brachiacanthini as a valid tribe.
