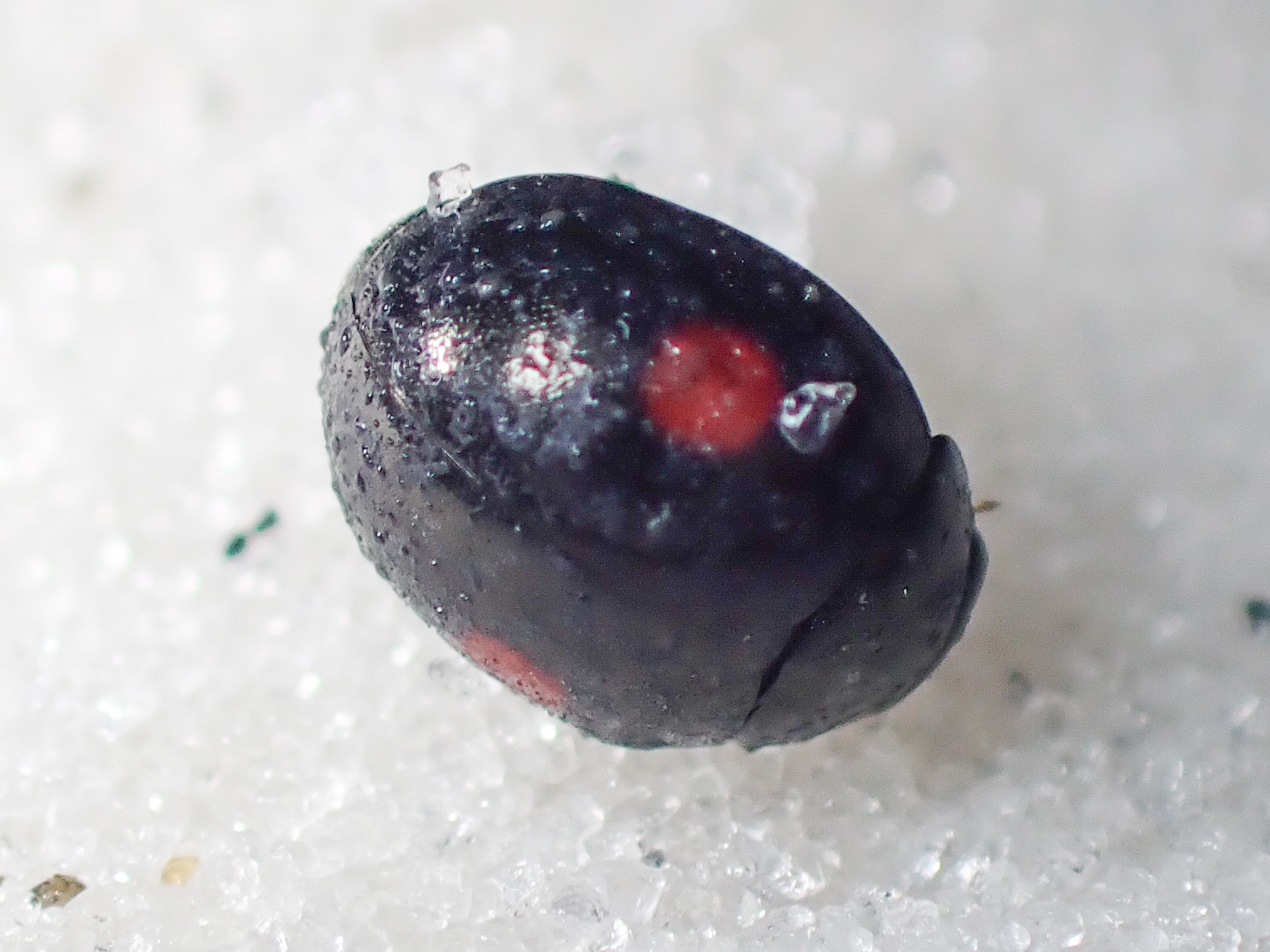

Scientific classification
- Kingdom: Animalia
- Phylum: Arthropoda
- Clade: Pancrustacea
- Class: Insecta
- Order: Coleoptera
- Suborder: Polyphaga
- Infraorder: Cucujiformia
- Family: Coccinellidae
- Genus: Hyperaspis
- Species: H. conviva

Binomial name
- Hyperaspis conviva Casey, 1924

Synonyms
- Hyperaspis insolens Casey, 1924; Hyperaspis congressis Watson, 1960

= Hyperaspis conviva =

Species of beetle

Hyperaspis conviva is a species of lady beetle in the family Coccinellidae. It is found in North America, where it has been recorded from Manitoba, Ontario, Saskatchewan, Alabama, Washington D.C., Florida, Louisiana, Maine, Maryland, New Jersey, New York, North Carolina, Pennsylvania, Virginia and West Virginia.

== Description ==
Adults reach a length of about 2.70-3.80 mm. The colour pattern of the adults is similar to that of in Hyperaspis signata.
