= Hyperaspis unimaculosa =

Scientific classification
- Kingdom: Animalia
- Phylum: Arthropoda
- Clade: Pancrustacea
- Class: Insecta
- Order: Coleoptera
- Suborder: Polyphaga
- Infraorder: Cucujiformia
- Family: Coccinellidae
- Genus: Hyperaspis
- Species: H. unimaculosa

Binomial name
- Hyperaspis unimaculosa Gordon & González, 2011

Species of beetle

Hyperaspis unimaculosa is a species of beetle of the family Coccinellidae. It is found in Brazil.

== Description ==
Adults reach a length of about 2.6–3.0 mm. They have a black body and yellow head. The pronotum is black, with the anterior one-sixth and lateral one-fourth yellow. The elytron is black with the lateral and apical margins yellow.

== Etymology ==
The species name is derived from Latin uno (meaning one) and macula (meaning spot) and refers to the similar species Hyperaspis uninotata.
