= Hyperaspis weisei =

Scientific classification
- Kingdom: Animalia
- Phylum: Arthropoda
- Clade: Pancrustacea
- Class: Insecta
- Order: Coleoptera
- Suborder: Polyphaga
- Infraorder: Cucujiformia
- Family: Coccinellidae
- Genus: Hyperaspis
- Species: H. weisei

Binomial name
- Hyperaspis weisei Schaeffer, 1908

Synonyms
- Hyperaspis proba weisei

Species of beetle

Hyperaspis weisei, or Weise's lady beetle, is a species of lady beetle in the family Coccinellidae. It is found in North America, where it has been recorded from Texas.

== Description ==
Adults reach a length of about 2.25 mm. Adults are similar to Hyperaspis proba, but the elytron has a marginal spot behind the humeral callus.
