= Hyperaspis pinguis =

Scientific classification
- Kingdom: Animalia
- Phylum: Arthropoda
- Clade: Pancrustacea
- Class: Insecta
- Order: Coleoptera
- Suborder: Polyphaga
- Infraorder: Cucujiformia
- Family: Coccinellidae
- Genus: Hyperaspis
- Species: H. pinguis

Binomial name
- Hyperaspis pinguis Casey, 1899

Species of beetle

Hyperaspis pinguis is a species of beetle in the family Coccinellidae. It is found in North America, where it has been recorded from Arizona.

== Description ==
Adults reach a length of about 3.30-3.50 mm. Adults are similar to Hyperaspis lateralis, but the pronotum of the males has a yellow lateral area and the female pronotum has a large yellow triangular lateral area. The elytron has a large subhumeral spot.
