= Hyperaspis dobzhanskyi =

Scientific classification
- Kingdom: Animalia
- Phylum: Arthropoda
- Clade: Pancrustacea
- Class: Insecta
- Order: Coleoptera
- Suborder: Polyphaga
- Infraorder: Cucujiformia
- Family: Coccinellidae
- Genus: Hyperaspis
- Species: H. dobzhanskyi

Binomial name
- Hyperaspis dobzhanskyi Gordon, 1985

Species of beetle

Hyperaspis dobzhanskyi, or Dobzhansky's lady beetle, is a species of lady beetle in the family Coccinellidae. It is found in North America, where it has been recorded from Arizona.

== Description ==
Adults reach a length of about 2.45 mm. The colour pattern is similar to that of Hyperaspis rotunda, but the apical spot on the elytron nearly reaches the elytral suture.
