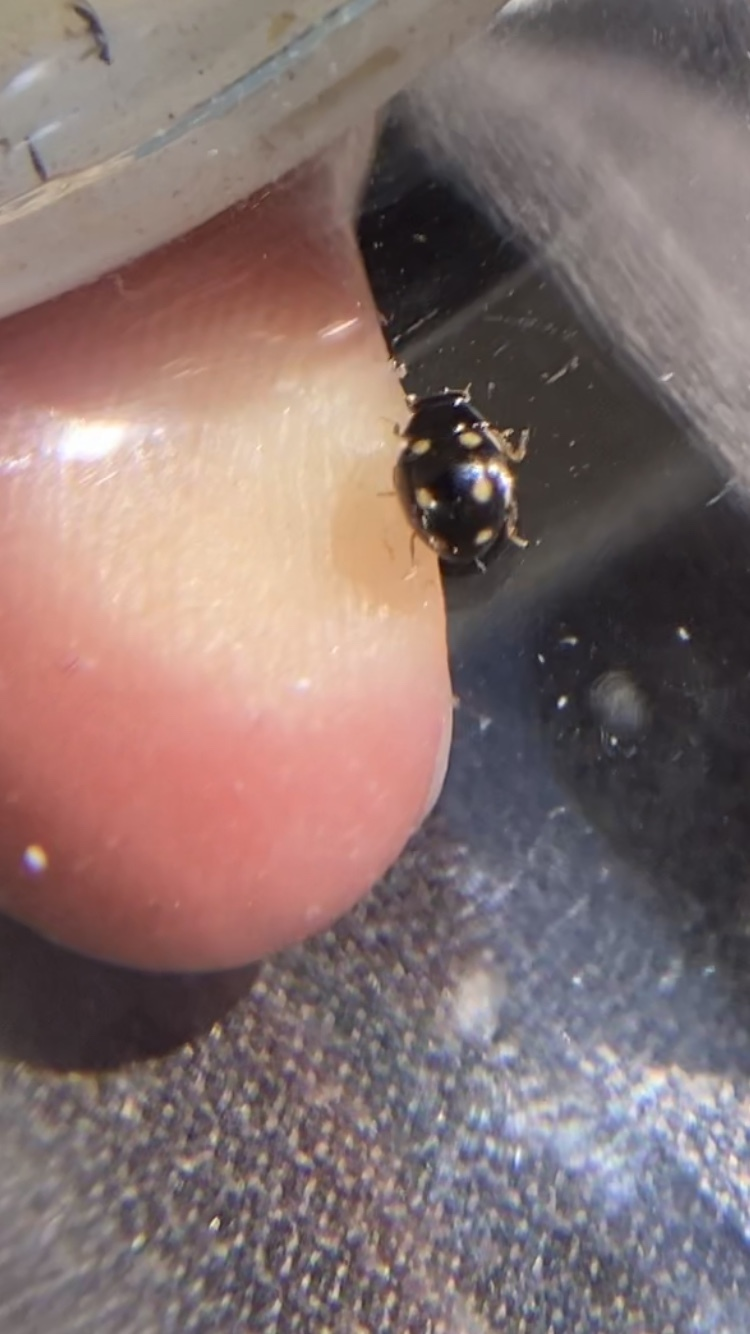

Scientific classification
- Kingdom: Animalia
- Phylum: Arthropoda
- Clade: Pancrustacea
- Class: Insecta
- Order: Coleoptera
- Suborder: Polyphaga
- Infraorder: Cucujiformia
- Family: Coccinellidae
- Genus: Hyperaspis
- Species: H. troglodytes

Binomial name
- Hyperaspis troglodytes (Mulsant, 1853)

Synonyms
- Cleothera troglodytes Mulsant, 1853; Hyperaspis discreta LeConte, 1880; Hyperaspis novascotiae Chapin, 1955

= Hyperaspis troglodytes =

Species of beetle

Hyperaspis troglodytes, the troglodyte lady beetle, is a species of lady beetle in the family Coccinellidae. It is found in North America, where it has been recorded from Connecticut, Indiana, Iowa, Massachusetts, Minnesota and Pennsylvania.

== Description ==
Adults reach a length of about 2.0-2.75 mm. The colour pattern of the elytron is similar to that of Hyperaspis disconotata, but the basal spots are widely separated.
