= Diazonema cavifrons =

Scientific classification
- Kingdom: Animalia
- Phylum: Arthropoda
- Class: Insecta
- Order: Coleoptera
- Suborder: Polyphaga
- Infraorder: Cucujiformia
- Family: Coccinellidae
- Genus: Diazonema
- Species: D. cavifrons

Binomial name
- Diazonema cavifrons (Weise, 1903)

Synonyms
- Corystes cavifrons Weise, 1903

Species of beetle

Diazonema cavifrons is a species of beetle of the family Coccinellidae. It is found in Costa Rica.

== Description ==
Adults reach a length of about 4.5 mm. They have a pale yellowish brown body and a yellow head. The lateral one-third of the pronotum is yellow, while the median one-third is yellowish brown. There is oval yellow spot near base on each side of the middle. The lateral margin of the elytron is slightly darker brown.

== Taxonomy ==
The species was treated as a synonym of Diazonema hypocrita for a while, but was reinstated as a valid species in 2008.
