= Selvadius rectus =

Scientific classification
- Kingdom: Animalia
- Phylum: Arthropoda
- Class: Insecta
- Order: Coleoptera
- Suborder: Polyphaga
- Infraorder: Cucujiformia
- Family: Coccinellidae
- Genus: Selvadius
- Species: S. rectus

Binomial name
- Selvadius rectus Casey, 1899

Species of beetle

Selvadius rectus is a species of beetle of the family Coccinellidae. It is found in North America, where it has been recorded from Arizona.

== Description ==
Adults reach a length of about 1.40 mm. They are very similar to Selvadius maderi.
