= Hyperaspis sphaeridioides =

Scientific classification
- Kingdom: Animalia
- Phylum: Arthropoda
- Clade: Pancrustacea
- Class: Insecta
- Order: Coleoptera
- Suborder: Polyphaga
- Infraorder: Cucujiformia
- Family: Coccinellidae
- Genus: Hyperaspis
- Species: H. sphaeridioides

Binomial name
- Hyperaspis sphaeridioides Mulsant, 1850

Synonyms
- Coccinella cruciata Germain, 1854

Species of beetle

Hyperaspis sphaeridioides is a species of beetle of the family Coccinellidae. It is found in Chile.

== Description ==
Adults reach a length of about 2.3–2.7 mm. They have a black body and yellow head. The pronotum is yellow with a large black spot. The elytron has two irregular yellow bands.
