= Hyperaspis longula =

Scientific classification
- Kingdom: Animalia
- Phylum: Arthropoda
- Clade: Pancrustacea
- Class: Insecta
- Order: Coleoptera
- Suborder: Polyphaga
- Infraorder: Cucujiformia
- Family: Coccinellidae
- Genus: Hyperaspis
- Species: H. longula

Binomial name
- Hyperaspis longula Weise, 1922

Species of beetle

Hyperaspis longula is a species of beetle of the family Coccinellidae. It is found in Argentina and Brazil.

== Description ==
Adults reach a length of about 2.6–3.0 mm. They have a black body and yellow head. The pronotum is black with the lateral one-sixth yellow. The elytron has three yellow spots.
