= Mimoscymnus pseudomacula =

Scientific classification
- Kingdom: Animalia
- Phylum: Arthropoda
- Class: Insecta
- Order: Coleoptera
- Suborder: Polyphaga
- Infraorder: Cucujiformia
- Family: Coccinellidae
- Genus: Mimoscymnus
- Species: M. pseudomacula

Binomial name
- Mimoscymnus pseudomacula Gordon, 2002

Species of beetle

Mimoscymnus pseudomacula is a species of beetle of the family Coccinellidae. It is found in Colombia.

== Description ==
Adults reach a length of about 1.8–2.5 mm. Adults are black, although the elytron has a large yellow median area.

== Etymology ==
The species name refers to its similarity with Mimoscymnus macula.
