= Thalassa similaris =

Scientific classification
- Kingdom: Animalia
- Phylum: Arthropoda
- Class: Insecta
- Order: Coleoptera
- Suborder: Polyphaga
- Infraorder: Cucujiformia
- Family: Coccinellidae
- Genus: Thalassa
- Species: T. similaris

Binomial name
- Thalassa similaris Mulsant, 1850

Species of beetle

Thalassa similaris is a species of beetle of the family Coccinellidae. It was described from New Grenada, which could refer to either present-day Colombia or Venezuela.

== Description ==
This species is similar to Thalassa glauca, but may be distinguished by the narrowly yellow pronotal borders.
