= Hyperaspis bisignata =

Scientific classification
- Kingdom: Animalia
- Phylum: Arthropoda
- Clade: Pancrustacea
- Class: Insecta
- Order: Coleoptera
- Suborder: Polyphaga
- Infraorder: Cucujiformia
- Family: Coccinellidae
- Genus: Hyperaspis
- Species: H. bisignata

Binomial name
- Hyperaspis bisignata Gordon & Canepari, 2008

Species of beetle

Hyperaspis bisignata is a species of beetle of the family Coccinellidae. It is found in Argentina, Bolivia and Brazil.

== Description ==
Adults reach a length of about 2.6–3.3 mm. They have a black body and yellow head. The lateral one-fourth and apical one-fourth of the pronotum are yellow. The elytron has two yellow spots.

== Etymology ==
The species name is derived from Latin bis (meaning two) and signata (meaning mark) and refers to the presence of two spots on each elytron.
