= Prognataspis surreptiva =

Scientific classification
- Kingdom: Animalia
- Phylum: Arthropoda
- Class: Insecta
- Order: Coleoptera
- Suborder: Polyphaga
- Infraorder: Cucujiformia
- Family: Coccinellidae
- Genus: Prognataspis
- Species: P. surreptiva

Binomial name
- Prognataspis surreptiva Gordon & Canepari, 2008

Species of beetle

Prognataspis surreptiva is a species of beetle of the family Coccinellidae. It is found in Ecuador.

== Description ==
Adults reach a length of about 2.6 mm. They have a black body and a yellow head. The lateral one-third and apical one-fourth of the pronotum are yellow. The elytron has one large yellow spot.

== Etymology ==
The species name is derived from Latin surreptivus (meaning false or fraudulent) and refers to the deceptive resemblance to many Hyperaspis species.
