= Hyperaspis chapini =

Scientific classification
- Kingdom: Animalia
- Phylum: Arthropoda
- Clade: Pancrustacea
- Class: Insecta
- Order: Coleoptera
- Suborder: Polyphaga
- Infraorder: Cucujiformia
- Family: Coccinellidae
- Genus: Hyperaspis
- Species: H. chapini

Binomial name
- Hyperaspis chapini Dobzhansky, 1941

Species of beetle

Hyperaspis chapini, or Chapin's sigil lady beetle, is a species of helesius, hyperaspidius, hyperaspis, and thalassa in the family Coccinellidae. It is found in North America, where it has been recorded from California, Idaho, Utah and Oregon.

== Description ==
Adults reach a length of about 2.0-2.75 mm. The anterior margin and lateral area of the pronotum of the males is yellow, while the pronotum of the females has a black anterior margin and a yellow lateral vitta. The elytron has two yellow spots.
