= Hyperaspis medialis =

Scientific classification
- Kingdom: Animalia
- Phylum: Arthropoda
- Clade: Pancrustacea
- Class: Insecta
- Order: Coleoptera
- Suborder: Polyphaga
- Infraorder: Cucujiformia
- Family: Coccinellidae
- Genus: Hyperaspis
- Species: H. medialis

Binomial name
- Hyperaspis medialis Casey, 1899

Synonyms
- Hyperaspis pratensis medialis

Species of beetle

Hyperaspis medialis, the medial lady beetle, is a species of lady beetle in the family Coccinellidae. It is found in North America, where it has been recorded from Arizona and Texas.

== Description ==
Adults reach a length of about 2-2.50 mm. The colour pattern is similar to that of Hyperaspis pratensis, but the yellow spots on the elytron are longer.
