= Hyperaspis bolteri =

Scientific classification
- Kingdom: Animalia
- Phylum: Arthropoda
- Clade: Pancrustacea
- Class: Insecta
- Order: Coleoptera
- Suborder: Polyphaga
- Infraorder: Cucujiformia
- Family: Coccinellidae
- Genus: Hyperaspis
- Species: H. bolteri

Binomial name
- Hyperaspis bolteri LeConte, 1880

Species of insect

Hyperaspis bolteri is a species of lady beetle in the family Coccinellidae. It is found in North America, where it has been recorded from Illinois, Indiana and Kansas.

It is generally 3.0-3.25 mm in size, and is describes as having a "highly distinctive color pattern and extremely dull pronotal surface."
