= Hyperaspidius mimus =

Scientific classification
- Kingdom: Animalia
- Phylum: Arthropoda
- Class: Insecta
- Order: Coleoptera
- Suborder: Polyphaga
- Infraorder: Cucujiformia
- Family: Coccinellidae
- Genus: Hyperaspidius
- Species: H. mimus

Binomial name
- Hyperaspidius mimus Casey, 1924

Synonyms
- Hyperaspidius carri Nunenmacher, 1948; Hyperaspidius coloradensis Nunenmacher, 1948

Species of beetle

Hyperaspidius mimus, the imitative lady beetle, is a species of beetle of the family Coccinellidae. It is found in North America, where it has been recorded from Alberta, Saskatchewan, Colorado, Idaho, Montana, Nebraska, Utah and Wyoming.

== Description ==
Adults reach a length of about 1.40–1.80 mm. Adults are similar to Hyperaspidius comparatus, but the pronotum of the females sometimes has a yellow anterior margin.
