= Hyperaspidius ingenitus =

Scientific classification
- Kingdom: Animalia
- Phylum: Arthropoda
- Class: Insecta
- Order: Coleoptera
- Suborder: Polyphaga
- Infraorder: Cucujiformia
- Family: Coccinellidae
- Genus: Hyperaspidius
- Species: H. ingenitus

Binomial name
- Hyperaspidius ingenitus Casey, 1899

Species of beetle

Hyperaspidius ingenitus is a species of beetle of the family Coccinellidae. It is found in North America, where it has been recorded from New Mexico.

== Description ==
Adults reach a length of about 1.75–2.50 mm. Adults are nearly identical to Hyperaspidius oblongus.
