= Peruaspis hypocrita =

Scientific classification
- Kingdom: Animalia
- Phylum: Arthropoda
- Class: Insecta
- Order: Coleoptera
- Suborder: Polyphaga
- Infraorder: Cucujiformia
- Family: Coccinellidae
- Genus: Peruaspis
- Species: P. hypocrita

Binomial name
- Peruaspis hypocrita Gordon & Canepari, 2008

Species of beetle

Peruaspis hypocrita is a species of beetle of the family Coccinellidae. It is found in Peru.

== Description ==
Adults reach a length of about 3.3 mm. They have a yellow body. The pronotum has two large black spots. The elytron has a black border and three black spots.

== Etymology ==
The species name is derived from Latin hypocrita (meaning mime, player) and refers to the resemblance to Hyperaspis onerata.
