= Hyperaspis germainii =

Scientific classification
- Kingdom: Animalia
- Phylum: Arthropoda
- Clade: Pancrustacea
- Class: Insecta
- Order: Coleoptera
- Suborder: Polyphaga
- Infraorder: Cucujiformia
- Family: Coccinellidae
- Genus: Hyperaspis
- Species: H. germainii

Binomial name
- Hyperaspis germainii Crotch, 1874

Species of beetle

Hyperaspis germainii is a species of beetle of the family Coccinellidae. It is found in Chile and Argentina.

== Description ==
Adults reach a length of about 2.4–3.0 mm. They have a black body and yellow head. The anterior margin and the anterolateral angle of the pronotum are yellow. The elytron has a basal yellow border and one small discal spot.
