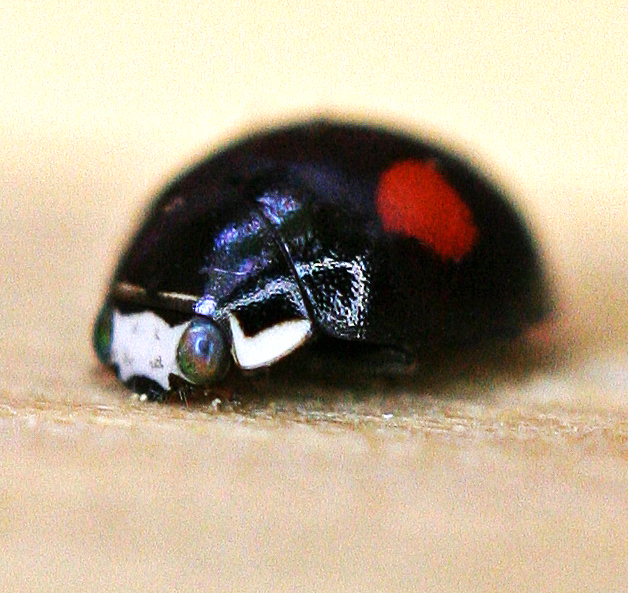

Scientific classification
- Kingdom: Animalia
- Phylum: Arthropoda
- Clade: Pancrustacea
- Class: Insecta
- Order: Coleoptera
- Suborder: Polyphaga
- Infraorder: Cucujiformia
- Family: Coccinellidae
- Genus: Hyperaspis
- Species: H. signata

Binomial name
- Hyperaspis signata (Olivier, 1808)

Synonyms
- Coccinella signata Olivier, 1808; Hyperaspis taedata LeConte, 1880; Hyperaspis bicentralis Casey, 1899

= Hyperaspis signata =

Species of beetle

Hyperaspis signata is a species of lady beetle in the family Coccinellidae. It is found in North America, where it has been recorded from Massachusetts to Florida, west to Wisconsin and east Texas. It is also found in Oklahoma.

== Description ==
Adults reach a length of about 2.60-4.0 mm (ssp. signata) and 2.60-3.25 mm (ssp. bicentralis). The pronotum of the males has yellow anterior and lateral margins. The elytron has one or two yellow or red spots.

== Subspecies ==
These two subspecies belong to the species Hyperaspis signata:

- Hyperaspis signata bicentralis Casey, 1899 (Oklahoma, Texas)
- Hyperaspis signata signata (Olivier, 1808) (Massachusetts to Florida, west to Wisconsin and east Texas)
