= Hyperaspis brunnescens =

Scientific classification
- Kingdom: Animalia
- Phylum: Arthropoda
- Clade: Pancrustacea
- Class: Insecta
- Order: Coleoptera
- Suborder: Polyphaga
- Infraorder: Cucujiformia
- Family: Coccinellidae
- Genus: Hyperaspis
- Species: H. brunnescens

Binomial name
- Hyperaspis brunnescens Dobzhansky, 1941

Species of beetle

Hyperaspis brunnescens is a species of lady beetle in the family Coccinellidae. It is found in North America, where it has been recorded from Illinois.

== Description ==
Adults reach a length of about 2.30-2.50 mm. The pronotum of the males is dull yellow, while the pronotum of the females is brownish black with a faint yellow lateral border. The elytron is brownish black with two vittae.
