= Mimoscymnus ramosi =

Scientific classification
- Kingdom: Animalia
- Phylum: Arthropoda
- Class: Insecta
- Order: Coleoptera
- Suborder: Polyphaga
- Infraorder: Cucujiformia
- Family: Coccinellidae
- Genus: Mimoscymnus
- Species: M. ramosi

Binomial name
- Mimoscymnus ramosi Gordon, 2002

Species of beetle

Mimoscymnus ramosi is a species of beetle of the family Coccinellidae. It is found in Colombia.

== Description ==
Adults reach a length of about 1.7–2.1 mm. Adults are black, although the elytron is brown with a small yellow spot.

== Etymology ==
The species is named for the collector of the type series.
