= Tenuisvalvae caucaensis =

Scientific classification
- Kingdom: Animalia
- Phylum: Arthropoda
- Class: Insecta
- Order: Coleoptera
- Suborder: Polyphaga
- Infraorder: Cucujiformia
- Family: Coccinellidae
- Genus: Tenuisvalvae
- Species: T. caucaensis

Binomial name
- Tenuisvalvae caucaensis Gordon & Canepari, 2008

Species of beetle

Tenuisvalvae caucaensis is a species of beetle of the family Coccinellidae. It is found in Colombia.

== Description ==
Adults reach a length of about 3 mm. They have a black body, but the apical three-fourth of the head is yellow. The lateral one-third of the pronotum is yellow. The elytron has three large spots.

== Etymology ==
The species is named for the Department of Cauca, where the type specimens were collected.
