= Menoscelis saginata =

Scientific classification
- Kingdom: Animalia
- Phylum: Arthropoda
- Class: Insecta
- Order: Coleoptera
- Suborder: Polyphaga
- Infraorder: Cucujiformia
- Family: Coccinellidae
- Genus: Menoscelis
- Species: M. saginata

Binomial name
- Menoscelis saginata Mulsant, 1850

Species of beetle

Menoscelis saginata is a species of beetle of the family Coccinellidae. It is found in French Guiana and Peru.

== Description ==
Adults reach a length of about 5.8 mm. They have a yellow body, the pronotum with a H-shaped dark brown spot, with an oval yellow spot on each side of the middle. The elytron has three reddish brown spots.
