= Thalassa flaviceps =

Scientific classification
- Kingdom: Animalia
- Phylum: Arthropoda
- Class: Insecta
- Order: Coleoptera
- Suborder: Polyphaga
- Infraorder: Cucujiformia
- Family: Coccinellidae
- Genus: Thalassa
- Species: T. flaviceps

Binomial name
- Thalassa flaviceps Mulsant, 1850

Synonyms
- Thalassa prasina Mulsant, 1850

Species of beetle

Thalassa flaviceps is a species of beetle of the family Coccinellidae. It is found in Cuba.
