= Mimoscymnus brevicapillus =

Scientific classification
- Kingdom: Animalia
- Phylum: Arthropoda
- Class: Insecta
- Order: Coleoptera
- Suborder: Polyphaga
- Infraorder: Cucujiformia
- Family: Coccinellidae
- Genus: Mimoscymnus
- Species: M. brevicapillus

Binomial name
- Mimoscymnus brevicapillus Gordon, 2002

Species of beetle

Mimoscymnus brevicapillus is a species of beetle of the family Coccinellidae. It is found in Ecuador.

== Description ==
Adults reach a length of about 2.4–2.6 mm. Adults are black, the elytron with a vague brassy sheen and the apex reddish brown.

== Etymology ==
The species name is derived from Latin brevis (meaning short) and capillus (meaning hair) and refers to the short dorsal pubescence.
