= Mimoscymnus anthracinus =

Scientific classification
- Kingdom: Animalia
- Phylum: Arthropoda
- Class: Insecta
- Order: Coleoptera
- Suborder: Polyphaga
- Infraorder: Cucujiformia
- Family: Coccinellidae
- Genus: Mimoscymnus
- Species: M. anthracinus

Binomial name
- Mimoscymnus anthracinus Gordon, 2002

Species of beetle

Mimoscymnus anthracinus is a species of beetle of the family Coccinellidae. It is found in Venezuela.

== Description ==
Adults reach a length of about 2.2 mm. Adults are black, although the elytron has a reddish brown apex.

== Etymology ==
The species name is derived from Latin anthracinus (meaning coal black) and refers to the mostly black body colour.
