= Tenuisvalvae unipunctata =

Scientific classification
- Kingdom: Animalia
- Phylum: Arthropoda
- Class: Insecta
- Order: Coleoptera
- Suborder: Polyphaga
- Infraorder: Cucujiformia
- Family: Coccinellidae
- Genus: Tenuisvalvae
- Species: T. unipunctata

Binomial name
- Tenuisvalvae unipunctata (Crotch, 1874)

Synonyms
- Hyperaspis unipunctata Crotch, 1874

Species of beetle

Tenuisvalvae unipunctata is a species of beetle of the family Coccinellidae. It is found in Trinidad and Brazil.

== Description ==
Adults reach a length of about 2.3 mm. They have a black body. The pronotum has a small triangular spot. The elytron has a large yellow spot.
