= Hyperaspidius wolcotti =

Scientific classification
- Kingdom: Animalia
- Phylum: Arthropoda
- Class: Insecta
- Order: Coleoptera
- Suborder: Polyphaga
- Infraorder: Cucujiformia
- Family: Coccinellidae
- Genus: Hyperaspidius
- Species: H. wolcotti

Binomial name
- Hyperaspidius wolcotti (Nunenmacher, 1911)

Synonyms
- Hyperaspis wolcotti Nunenmacher, 1911

Species of beetle

Hyperaspidius wolcotti, or Wolcott's lady beetle, is a species of lady beetle in the family Coccinellidae. It is found in North America, where it has been recorded from Indiana, Iowa and Kansas.

== Description ==
Adults reach a length of about 2-2.60 mm. The pronotum of the males is yellow with black spots in the basal area, while the female pronotum is black with a yellow lateral margin. The elytron is black with a yellow vitta on the lateral margin and an incomplete discal vitta.
