= Hyperaspidius pallescens =

Scientific classification
- Kingdom: Animalia
- Phylum: Arthropoda
- Class: Insecta
- Order: Coleoptera
- Suborder: Polyphaga
- Infraorder: Cucujiformia
- Family: Coccinellidae
- Genus: Hyperaspidius
- Species: H. pallescens

Binomial name
- Hyperaspidius pallescens Casey, 1908

Species of beetle

Hyperaspidius pallescens is a species of beetle of the family Coccinellidae. It is found in North America, where it has been recorded from Arizona.

== Description ==
Adults reach a length of about 1.60–2.10 mm. The pronotum of the males is yellow with indistinct yellowish brown spots, while the pronotum of the females is yellowish brown with a yellow lateral margin. There are two yellow vittae on the elytron.
