= Hyperaspidius algodonus =

Scientific classification
- Kingdom: Animalia
- Phylum: Arthropoda
- Class: Insecta
- Order: Coleoptera
- Suborder: Polyphaga
- Infraorder: Cucujiformia
- Family: Coccinellidae
- Genus: Hyperaspidius
- Species: H. algodonus

Binomial name
- Hyperaspidius algodonus Gordon, 1985

Species of beetle

Hyperaspidius algodonus is a species of beetle of the family Coccinellidae. It is found in North America, where it has been recorded from California.

== Description ==
Adults reach a length of about 2 mm. The head and pronotum are yellow, the pronotum with a nebulous spot in the basal area. The elytron is black a yellow vitta on the anterior and lateral borders, connected to an incomplete discal vitta.

== Etymology ==
The specific name refers to the type locality.
