= Hyperaspidius ploribundus =

Scientific classification
- Kingdom: Animalia
- Phylum: Arthropoda
- Class: Insecta
- Order: Coleoptera
- Suborder: Polyphaga
- Infraorder: Cucujiformia
- Family: Coccinellidae
- Genus: Hyperaspidius
- Species: H. ploribundus

Binomial name
- Hyperaspidius ploribundus (Nunenmacher, 1911)

Synonyms
- Hyperaspis ploribunda Nunenmacher, 1911; Hyperaspidius immaculatus Hatch, 1961; Hyperaspidius arcuatus Hatch, 1961 (not LeConte)

Species of beetle

Hyperaspidius ploribundus is a species of beetle of the family Coccinellidae. It is found in North America, where it has been recorded from California, Nevada, Idaho and Oregon.

== Description ==
Adults reach a length of about 1.50–1.80 mm. The head and pronotum of the males and females is dark brown, with the anterolateral angle of the pronotum yellowish brown. The elytron is reddish brown.
