= Brachiacanthini =

Scientific classification
- Kingdom: Animalia
- Phylum: Arthropoda
- Clade: Pancrustacea
- Class: Insecta
- Order: Coleoptera
- Suborder: Polyphaga
- Infraorder: Cucujiformia
- Family: Coccinellidae
- Subfamily: Coccinellinae
- Tribe: Brachiacanthini; Mulsant, 1850

Tribe of beetles

Brachiacanthini is a tribe of insects within the family Coccinellidae. The tribe is treated as a synonym of Hyperaspidini by some authors, while others maintain it as a separate tribe.

== Taxonomy ==
Brachiacanthini contains the following genera:

- Brachiacantha
- Cleothera
- Cyrea
- Dilatitibialis
- Hinda
- Serratitibia
- Tiphysa
