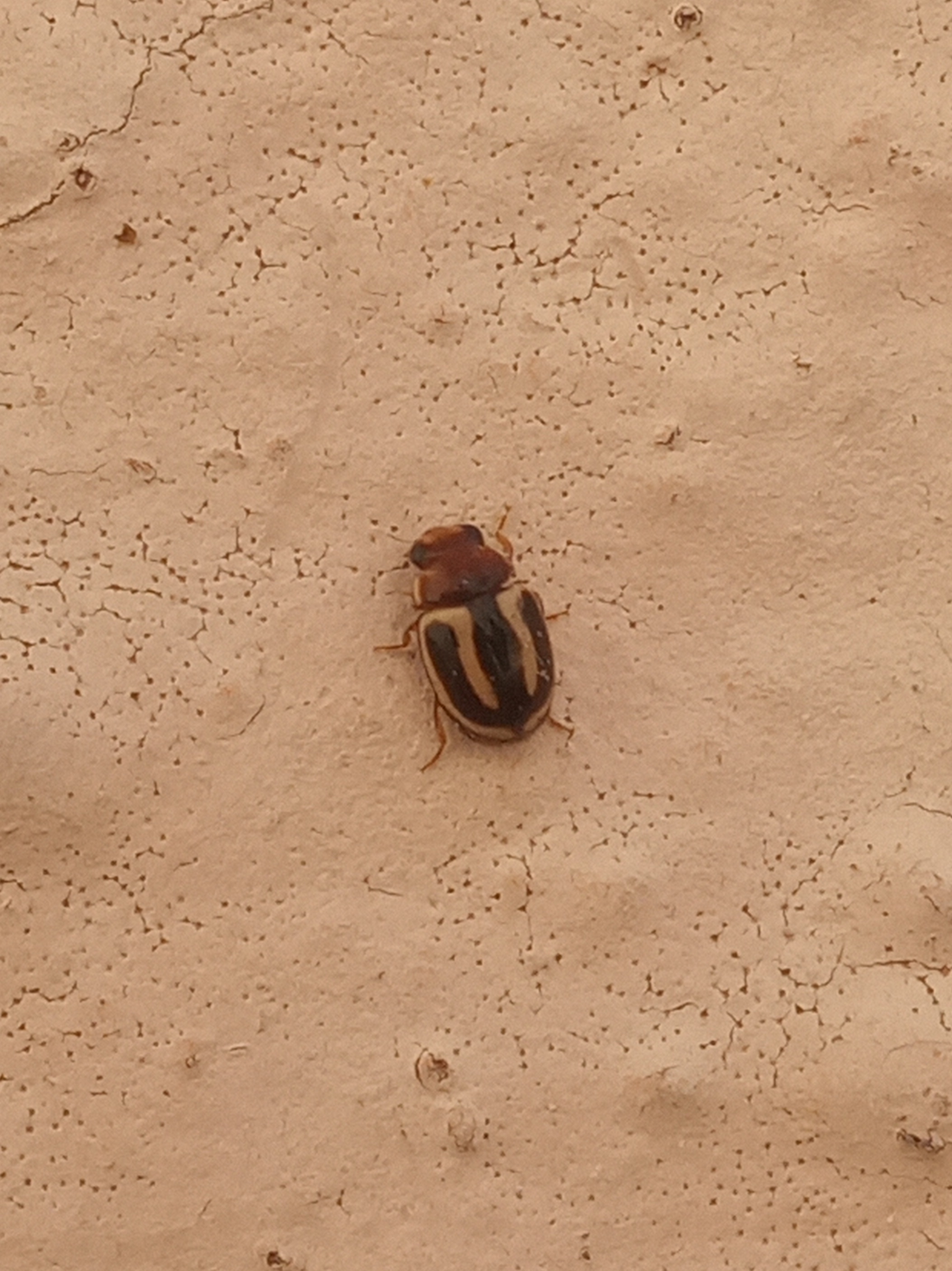

Scientific classification
- Kingdom: Animalia
- Phylum: Arthropoda
- Class: Insecta
- Order: Coleoptera
- Suborder: Polyphaga
- Infraorder: Cucujiformia
- Family: Coccinellidae
- Tribe: Hyperaspidini
- Genus: Hyperaspidius; Crotch, 1873

= Hyperaspidius =

Genus of beetles

Hyperaspidius is a genus in the family Coccinellidae. There are at least 20 described species in Hyperaspidius.

== Species ==
- Hyperaspidius algodonus Gordon, 1985
- Hyperaspidius andrewsi Gordon, 1985
- Hyperaspidius arcuatus (LeConte, 1852)
- Hyperaspidius blatchleyi Gordon, 1985
- Hyperaspidius brevilinea
- Hyperaspidius bryanti Nunenmacher, 1948
- Hyperaspidius comparatus Casey, 1899
- Hyperaspidius flavocephalus Blatchley, 1924
- Hyperaspidius hardyi Gordon, 1985
- Hyperaspidius hercules Belicek, 1976
- Hyperaspidius ingenitus Casey, 1899
- Hyperaspidius insignis Casey, 1899
- Hyperaspidius marginatus (Gaines, 1933)
- Hyperaspidius mexicanus
- Hyperaspidius militaris (LeConte, 1852)
- Hyperaspidius mimus Casey, 1924
- Hyperaspidius nanellus Gordon, 1985
- Hyperaspidius nubilatus (Casey, 1924)
- Hyperaspidius oblongus Casey, 1908
- Hyperaspidius pallescens Casey, 1908
- Hyperaspidius ploribundus (Nunenmacher, 1911)
- Hyperaspidius shauli Nunenmacher, 1944
- Hyperaspidius simulatus Gordon, 1985
- Hyperaspidius subtropicus
- Hyperaspidius transfugatus Casey, 1899
- Hyperaspidius trimaculatus
- Hyperaspidius tristis (LeConte, 1880)
- Hyperaspidius venustulus (Mulsant, 1850)
- Hyperaspidius vittigerus (LeConte, 1852) (vittate ladybug)
- Hyperaspidius wolcotti (Nunenmacher, 1911) (Wolcott's lady beetle)
