= Tenuisvalvae ecoffeti =

Scientific classification
- Kingdom: Animalia
- Phylum: Arthropoda
- Class: Insecta
- Order: Coleoptera
- Suborder: Polyphaga
- Infraorder: Cucujiformia
- Family: Coccinellidae
- Genus: Tenuisvalvae
- Species: T. ecoffeti

Binomial name
- Tenuisvalvae ecoffeti (Mulsant, 1853)

Synonyms
- Hyperaspis ecoffeti Mulsant, 1853; Hyperaspis quadrina Mulsant, 1853

Species of beetle

Tenuisvalvae ecoffeti is a species of beetle of the family Coccinellidae. It is found in Argentina, Brazil and Paraguay.

== Description ==
Adults reach a length of about 2.6-2.7 mm. They have a yellow body. The pronotum is black with the lateral and anterior borders yellow. The elytron has two black spots and a black sutural margin.
