= Hyperaspis uninotata =

Scientific classification
- Kingdom: Animalia
- Phylum: Arthropoda
- Clade: Pancrustacea
- Class: Insecta
- Order: Coleoptera
- Suborder: Polyphaga
- Infraorder: Cucujiformia
- Family: Coccinellidae
- Genus: Hyperaspis
- Species: H. uninotata

Binomial name
- Hyperaspis uninotata Gordon & Canepari, 2008

Species of beetle

Hyperaspis uninotata is a species of beetle of the family Coccinellidae. It is found in Brazil.

== Description ==
Adults reach a length of about 3 mm. They have a yellow body. The pronotum has a large black rectangular spot. The elytron is black medially, with a broad yellow border.

== Etymology ==
The species name is derived from Latin unicus (meaning sole or singular) and nota (meaning mark) and refers to the single black elytral macula.
