= Hyperaspis pratensis =

Scientific classification
- Kingdom: Animalia
- Phylum: Arthropoda
- Clade: Pancrustacea
- Class: Insecta
- Order: Coleoptera
- Suborder: Polyphaga
- Infraorder: Cucujiformia
- Family: Coccinellidae
- Genus: Hyperaspis
- Species: H. pratensis

Binomial name
- Hyperaspis pratensis LeConte, 1852

Species of beetle

Hyperaspis pratensis is a species of beetle in the family Coccinellidae. It is found in North America, where it has been recorded from Missouri, New Jersey and Massachusetts.

== Description ==
Adults reach a length of about 2.60 mm. The pronotum has a lateral yellow area and the elytron has three large yellow spots.
