= Mimoscymnus variegatus =

Scientific classification
- Kingdom: Animalia
- Phylum: Arthropoda
- Class: Insecta
- Order: Coleoptera
- Suborder: Polyphaga
- Infraorder: Cucujiformia
- Family: Coccinellidae
- Genus: Mimoscymnus
- Species: M. variegatus

Binomial name
- Mimoscymnus variegatus Gordon, 2002

Species of beetle

Mimoscymnus variegatus is a species of beetle of the family Coccinellidae. It is found in Colombia.

== Description ==
Adults reach a length of about 2.3–2.7 mm. Adults are black, although the anterior half of the head and a small spot on the elytron are reddish yellow.

== Etymology ==
The species name is derived from Latin variegatus (meaning of different colours) and refers to variable dorsal colour pattern.
