= Blaisdelliana sexualis =

Scientific classification
- Kingdom: Animalia
- Phylum: Arthropoda
- Class: Insecta
- Order: Coleoptera
- Suborder: Polyphaga
- Infraorder: Cucujiformia
- Family: Coccinellidae
- Genus: Blaisdelliana
- Species: B. sexualis

Binomial name
- Blaisdelliana sexualis (Casey, 1924)

Synonyms
- Hyperaspis sexualis Casey, 1924; Blaisdelliana vanduzeei Gordon, 1970

Species of beetle

Blaisdelliana sexualis is a species of beetle of the family Coccinellidae. It is found in North America, where it has been recorded from California and Arizona.

== Description ==
Adults reach a length of about 1.25–1.78 mm. They have a black to brown body, with the antennae, mouthparts and legs yellow.
