= Diazonema murilloi =

Scientific classification
- Kingdom: Animalia
- Phylum: Arthropoda
- Class: Insecta
- Order: Coleoptera
- Suborder: Polyphaga
- Infraorder: Cucujiformia
- Family: Coccinellidae
- Genus: Diazonema
- Species: D. murilloi

Binomial name
- Diazonema murilloi Gordon & Canepari, 2008

Species of beetle

Diazonema murilloi is a species of beetle of the family Coccinellidae. It is found in Colombia.

== Description ==
Adults reach a length of about 4.0–4.3 mm. They have a black body and yellow head. The apical margin and lateral three-eighth of the pronotum are yellow. The elytron has a greenish sheen and one large oval yellow spot.

== Etymology ==
The species is named in honour of L. M. Murillo, a Colombian entomologist who collected the type series.
