= Tenuisvalvae rosariensis =

Scientific classification
- Kingdom: Animalia
- Phylum: Arthropoda
- Class: Insecta
- Order: Coleoptera
- Suborder: Polyphaga
- Infraorder: Cucujiformia
- Family: Coccinellidae
- Genus: Tenuisvalvae
- Species: T. rosariensis

Binomial name
- Tenuisvalvae rosariensis (Gordon & Canepari, 2008)

Synonyms
- Hyperaspis rosariensis Gordon & Canepari, 2008

Species of beetle

Tenuisvalvae rosariensis is a species of beetle of the family Coccinellidae. It is found in Argentina.

== Description ==
Adults reach a length of about 2.6 mm. They have a black body and yellow head. The pronotum is yellow with a large basomedian spot. The elytron has two yellow spots.

== Etymology ==
The species is named for the type locality.
