= Hyperaspidius bryanti =

Scientific classification
- Kingdom: Animalia
- Phylum: Arthropoda
- Class: Insecta
- Order: Coleoptera
- Suborder: Polyphaga
- Infraorder: Cucujiformia
- Family: Coccinellidae
- Genus: Hyperaspidius
- Species: H. bryanti

Binomial name
- Hyperaspidius bryanti Nunenmacher, 1948

Species of beetle

Hyperaspidius bryanti is a species of beetle of the family Coccinellidae. It is found in North America, where it has been recorded from Arizona.

== Description ==
Adults reach a length of about 1.80–2.00 mm. The pronotum of the males is yellow with the basal two-thirds dark brown and a yellow lateral margin, while the pronotum of the females is dark reddish brown with a yellow lateral margin.
