= Hyperaspidius nubilatus =

Scientific classification
- Kingdom: Animalia
- Phylum: Arthropoda
- Class: Insecta
- Order: Coleoptera
- Suborder: Polyphaga
- Infraorder: Cucujiformia
- Family: Coccinellidae
- Genus: Hyperaspidius
- Species: H. nubilatus

Binomial name
- Hyperaspidius nubilatus (Casey, 1924)

Synonyms
- Hyperaspis nubilata Casey, 1924; Hyperaspis asphaltina Casey, 1924

Species of beetle

Hyperaspidius nubilatus is a species of beetle of the family Coccinellidae. It is found in North America, where it has been recorded from Florida, Georgia and North Carolina.

== Description ==
Adults reach a length of about 1.80–2.70 mm. The pronotum of the males black or dark brown with nebulous black areas in the basal area and with a yellow lateral margin. The female pronotum is black with a yellowish brown anterior angle. The elytron is black.
