= Diazonema pubescens =

Scientific classification
- Kingdom: Animalia
- Phylum: Arthropoda
- Class: Insecta
- Order: Coleoptera
- Suborder: Polyphaga
- Infraorder: Cucujiformia
- Family: Coccinellidae
- Genus: Diazonema
- Species: D. pubescens

Binomial name
- Diazonema pubescens (Weise, 1926)

Synonyms
- Corystes pubescens Weise, 1926

Species of beetle

Diazonema pubescens is a species of beetle of the family Coccinellidae. It is found in Ecuador and Peru.

== Description ==
Adults reach a length of about 5.5 mm. They have a yellow body, while the head and pronotum are dark yellow. The elytron is pale red with a yellow border.
