= Hyperaspidius shauli =

Scientific classification
- Kingdom: Animalia
- Phylum: Arthropoda
- Class: Insecta
- Order: Coleoptera
- Suborder: Polyphaga
- Infraorder: Cucujiformia
- Family: Coccinellidae
- Genus: Hyperaspidius
- Species: H. shauli

Binomial name
- Hyperaspidius shauli Nunenmacher, 1944

Species of beetle

Hyperaspidius shauli is a species of beetle of the family Coccinellidae. It is found in North America, where it has been recorded from Texas.

== Description ==
Adults reach a length of about 1.60–2.00 mm. The pronotum of the males is yellow with a nebulous brown spot in the basal area, while the female pronotum is yellow with a median brown area. The elytron is brown with a yellow vitta on lateral and anterior margins and a discal vitta.
