= Hyperaspidius militaris =

Scientific classification
- Kingdom: Animalia
- Phylum: Arthropoda
- Class: Insecta
- Order: Coleoptera
- Suborder: Polyphaga
- Infraorder: Cucujiformia
- Family: Coccinellidae
- Genus: Hyperaspidius
- Species: H. militaris

Binomial name
- Hyperaspidius militaris (LeConte, 1852)

Synonyms
- Hyperaspis militaris LeConte, 1852

Species of beetle

Hyperaspidius militaris is a species of lady beetle in the family Coccinellidae. It is found in North America, where it has been recorded from Alabama, Florida and South Carolina.

== Description ==
Adults reach a length of about 1.90-2.50 mm. The pronotum of the males is yellow with obscure brownish yellow markings, while the pronotum of the females is black with a yellow lateral border.
