= Hyperaspidius hardyi =

Scientific classification
- Kingdom: Animalia
- Phylum: Arthropoda
- Class: Insecta
- Order: Coleoptera
- Suborder: Polyphaga
- Infraorder: Cucujiformia
- Family: Coccinellidae
- Genus: Hyperaspidius
- Species: H. hardyi

Binomial name
- Hyperaspidius hardyi Gordon, 1985

Species of beetle

Hyperaspidius hardyi is a species of lady beetle in the family Coccinellidae. It is found in North America, where it has been recorded from California.

== Description ==
Adults reach a length of about 2.10 mm (males) and 2.20 mm (females). The head and pronotum of the males are yellow, the pronotum with a black basal area with a yellow spot. The elytron is yellow with a dark brown sutural margin and a dark brown vitta. Females are similar to males, but have a brownish yellow head and they have a dark brown pronotum with the lateral one-fourth yellow.

== Etymology ==
The species is named for one of the collectors of the type series.
