= Hyperaspis donzeli =

Scientific classification
- Kingdom: Animalia
- Phylum: Arthropoda
- Clade: Pancrustacea
- Class: Insecta
- Order: Coleoptera
- Suborder: Polyphaga
- Infraorder: Cucujiformia
- Family: Coccinellidae
- Genus: Hyperaspis
- Species: H. donzeli

Binomial name
- Hyperaspis donzeli (Mulsant, 1850)

Synonyms
- Cleothera donzeli Mulsant, 1850

Species of beetle

Hyperaspis donzeli is a species of beetle of the family Coccinellidae. It is found in Brazil and Paraguay.

== Description ==
Adults reach a length of about 3 mm. They have a black body. The pronotum is yellow with a large black spot. The elytron has three yellow spots.
