= Helesius nubilans =

Scientific classification
- Kingdom: Animalia
- Phylum: Arthropoda
- Class: Insecta
- Order: Coleoptera
- Suborder: Polyphaga
- Infraorder: Cucujiformia
- Family: Coccinellidae
- Genus: Helesius
- Species: H. nubilans

Binomial name
- Helesius nubilans Casey, 1899

Species of beetle

Helesius nubilans is a species of lady beetle in the family Coccinellidae. It is found in North America, where it has been recorded from Texas.

== Description ==
Adults reach a length of about 2.80–3 mm. They have a red head and the pronotum is dark red with a faint reddish brown area. The elytron is black or dark brown.
