= Hyperaspis jovialis =

Scientific classification
- Kingdom: Animalia
- Phylum: Arthropoda
- Clade: Pancrustacea
- Class: Insecta
- Order: Coleoptera
- Suborder: Polyphaga
- Infraorder: Cucujiformia
- Family: Coccinellidae
- Genus: Hyperaspis
- Species: H. jovialis

Binomial name
- Hyperaspis jovialis Fall, 1925

Synonyms
- Hyperaspis californica Dobzhansky, 1941; Hyperaspis taeniata var. perpallida Dobzhansky, 1941

Species of beetle

Hyperaspis jovialis is a species of lady beetle in the family Coccinellidae. It is found in North America, where it has been recorded from California, Nevada and Washington.

== Description ==
Adults reach a length of about 2.40-2.80 mm. The lateral one-fourth and the apical margin of the pronotum of the males is yellow, while the pronotum of the females is black with a yellow lateral margin. The colour pattern on the elytron varies from black with two orange spots to orange with a black border and a black spot.
