= Diazonema =

Scientific classification
- Kingdom: Animalia
- Phylum: Arthropoda
- Class: Insecta
- Order: Coleoptera
- Suborder: Polyphaga
- Infraorder: Cucujiformia
- Family: Coccinellidae
- Subfamily: Coccinellinae
- Tribe: Hyperaspidini
- Genus: Diazonema; Weise, 1926

Synonyms
- Corystes Mulsant, 1850 (preocc.); Meltema Özdikmen, 2007

Genus of beetles

Diazonema is a genus of lady beetles in the family Coccinellidae.

== Species ==
- Diazonema hypocrita (Mulsant, 1850)
- Diazonema fallax Weise, 1926
- Diazonema pubescens (Weise, 1926)
- Diazonema cavifrons (Weise, 1903)
- Diazonema boothi Gordon & Canepari, 2008
- Diazonema murilloi Gordon & Canepari, 2008
- Diazonema eccentrica Gordon & Canepari, 2008
