= Hyperaspidius insignis =

Scientific classification
- Kingdom: Animalia
- Phylum: Arthropoda
- Class: Insecta
- Order: Coleoptera
- Suborder: Polyphaga
- Infraorder: Cucujiformia
- Family: Coccinellidae
- Genus: Hyperaspidius
- Species: H. insignis

Binomial name
- Hyperaspidius insignis Casey, 1899

Species of beetle

Hyperaspidius insignis is a species of beetle of the family Coccinellidae. It is found in North America, where it has been recorded from Alberta, Colorado and Oklahoma.

== Description ==
Adults reach a length of about 2.25–3.20 mm. The pronotum is yellow with reddish yellow spots. The elytron is black with a yellow border and a discal spot.
