= Tenuisvalvae deyrollei =

Scientific classification
- Kingdom: Animalia
- Phylum: Arthropoda
- Class: Insecta
- Order: Coleoptera
- Suborder: Polyphaga
- Infraorder: Cucujiformia
- Family: Coccinellidae
- Genus: Tenuisvalvae
- Species: T. deyrollei

Binomial name
- Tenuisvalvae deyrollei (Crotch, 1874)

Synonyms
- Hyperaspis deyrollei Crotch, 1874

Species of beetle

Tenuisvalvae deyrollei is a species of beetle of the family Coccinellidae. It is found in southeastern South America.

== Description ==
Adults reach a length of about 2.3–2.7 mm. They have a black body and yellow head. The pronotum is reddish yellow with a black basomedian spot. The elytron has two large reddish yellow spots.
