= Hyperaspidius blatchleyi =

Scientific classification
- Kingdom: Animalia
- Phylum: Arthropoda
- Class: Insecta
- Order: Coleoptera
- Suborder: Polyphaga
- Infraorder: Cucujiformia
- Family: Coccinellidae
- Genus: Hyperaspidius
- Species: H. blatchleyi

Binomial name
- Hyperaspidius blatchleyi Gordon, 1985

Species of beetle

Hyperaspidius blatchleyi is a species of beetle of the family Coccinellidae. It is found in North America, where it has been recorded from Massachusetts.

== Description ==
Adults reach a length of about 1.90–2.40 mm. The head and pronotum are yellow, the pronotum with a median black area. The elytron is black with a yellow vitta on the lateral margin.

== Etymology ==
The species is named for W. S. Blatchley.
