= Thalassa pentaspilota =

Scientific classification
- Kingdom: Animalia
- Phylum: Arthropoda
- Class: Insecta
- Order: Coleoptera
- Suborder: Polyphaga
- Infraorder: Cucujiformia
- Family: Coccinellidae
- Genus: Thalassa
- Species: T. pentaspilota

Binomial name
- Thalassa pentaspilota (Chevrolat, 1835)

Synonyms
- Chilocorus pentaspilotus Chevrolat, 1835

Species of beetle

Thalassa pentaspilota is a species of beetle of the family Coccinellidae. It is found in Mexico, Guatemala and Venezuela.

== Description ==
The elytron has an apical yellow spot.
