= Mimoscymnus electus =

Scientific classification
- Kingdom: Animalia
- Phylum: Arthropoda
- Class: Insecta
- Order: Coleoptera
- Suborder: Polyphaga
- Infraorder: Cucujiformia
- Family: Coccinellidae
- Genus: Mimoscymnus
- Species: M. electus

Binomial name
- Mimoscymnus electus (Brèthes, 1925)

Synonyms
- Pullus electus Brèthes, 1925

Species of beetle

Mimoscymnus electus is a species of beetle of the family Coccinellidae. It is found in Argentina, Paraguay and Brazil.

== Description ==
Adults reach a length of about 2.1-2.6 mm. Adults are reddish yellow, although the pronotum is black with a yellow anterior angle. The elytron is reddish yellow with black margins.

== Etymology ==
The species is named for the collector of the holotype.
