= Mimoscymnus terminatus =

Scientific classification
- Kingdom: Animalia
- Phylum: Arthropoda
- Class: Insecta
- Order: Coleoptera
- Suborder: Polyphaga
- Infraorder: Cucujiformia
- Family: Coccinellidae
- Genus: Mimoscymnus
- Species: M. terminatus

Binomial name
- Mimoscymnus terminatus Gordon, 2002

Species of beetle

Mimoscymnus terminatus is a species of beetle of the family Coccinellidae. It is found in Colombia.

== Description ==
Adults reach a length of about 2.3-2.6 mm. Adults are black, although the elytron has a reddish yellow apical area. The legs are brownish yellow.

== Etymology ==
The species is named refers for the pale terminal area of the elytron.
