= Tenuisvalvae parenthesis =

Scientific classification
- Kingdom: Animalia
- Phylum: Arthropoda
- Class: Insecta
- Order: Coleoptera
- Suborder: Polyphaga
- Infraorder: Cucujiformia
- Family: Coccinellidae
- Genus: Tenuisvalvae
- Species: T. parenthesis

Binomial name
- Tenuisvalvae parenthesis Gordon & Canepari, 2008

Species of beetle

Tenuisvalvae parenthesis is a species of beetle of the family Coccinellidae. It is found in Colombia and Venezuela.

== Description ==
Adults reach a length of about 3.2–3.5 mm. They have a yellow body, the head with borders black. The basal border of the pronotum is black. The elytron has two short vitta and the suture is narrowly black with a parenthesis shaped vitta. There is also a small triangular spot in the posterior half.

== Etymology ==
The species is named for the curved elytral vitta reminiscent of a parenthesis.
