= Hinda designata =

Scientific classification
- Kingdom: Animalia
- Phylum: Arthropoda
- Clade: Pancrustacea
- Class: Insecta
- Order: Coleoptera
- Suborder: Polyphaga
- Infraorder: Cucujiformia
- Family: Coccinellidae
- Genus: Hinda
- Species: H. designata

Binomial name
- Hinda designata (Mulsant, 1850)

Synonyms
- Hynda 15-maculata Weise, 1895; Hinda quinquedecimmaculata; Helesius caseyi Sicard, 1912

Species of beetle

Hinda designata is a species of beetle of the family Coccinellidae. It is found in Colombia.

== Description ==
Adults reach a length of about 3.0–3.8 mm. They have a yellow body, with some light brown on the head. The pronotum has a black border and two black bands. The elytron is black with six large yellow spots.
