= Mimoscymnus caucaensis =

Scientific classification
- Kingdom: Animalia
- Phylum: Arthropoda
- Class: Insecta
- Order: Coleoptera
- Suborder: Polyphaga
- Infraorder: Cucujiformia
- Family: Coccinellidae
- Genus: Mimoscymnus
- Species: M. caucaensis

Binomial name
- Mimoscymnus caucaensis Gordon, 2002

Species of beetle

Mimoscymnus caucaensis is a species of beetle in the family Coccinellidae. It is found in Colombia.

== Description ==
Adults reach a length of about 2 mm. Adults are black, although the elytron has a brown apex.

== Etymology ==
The species is named for the type locality.
