= Menoscelis =

Scientific classification
- Kingdom: Animalia
- Phylum: Arthropoda
- Class: Insecta
- Order: Coleoptera
- Suborder: Polyphaga
- Infraorder: Cucujiformia
- Family: Coccinellidae
- Subfamily: Coccinellinae
- Tribe: Hyperaspidini
- Genus: Menoscelis; Mulsant, 1850

Genus of beetles

Menoscelis is a genus of lady beetles in the family Coccinellidae.

== Species ==
- Menoscelis angeloi Santos, Churata-Salcedo & Almeida, 2016
- Menoscelis brunella Corrêa, Almeida & Santos, 2011
- Menoscelis cordata Santos, Churata-Salcedo & Almeida, 2016
- Menoscelis flava Santos, Churata-Salcedo & Almeida, 2016
- Menoscelis insignis Mulsant, 1850
- Menoscelis saginata Mulsant, 1850
- Menoscelis stephani Corrêa, Almeida & Santos, 2011
