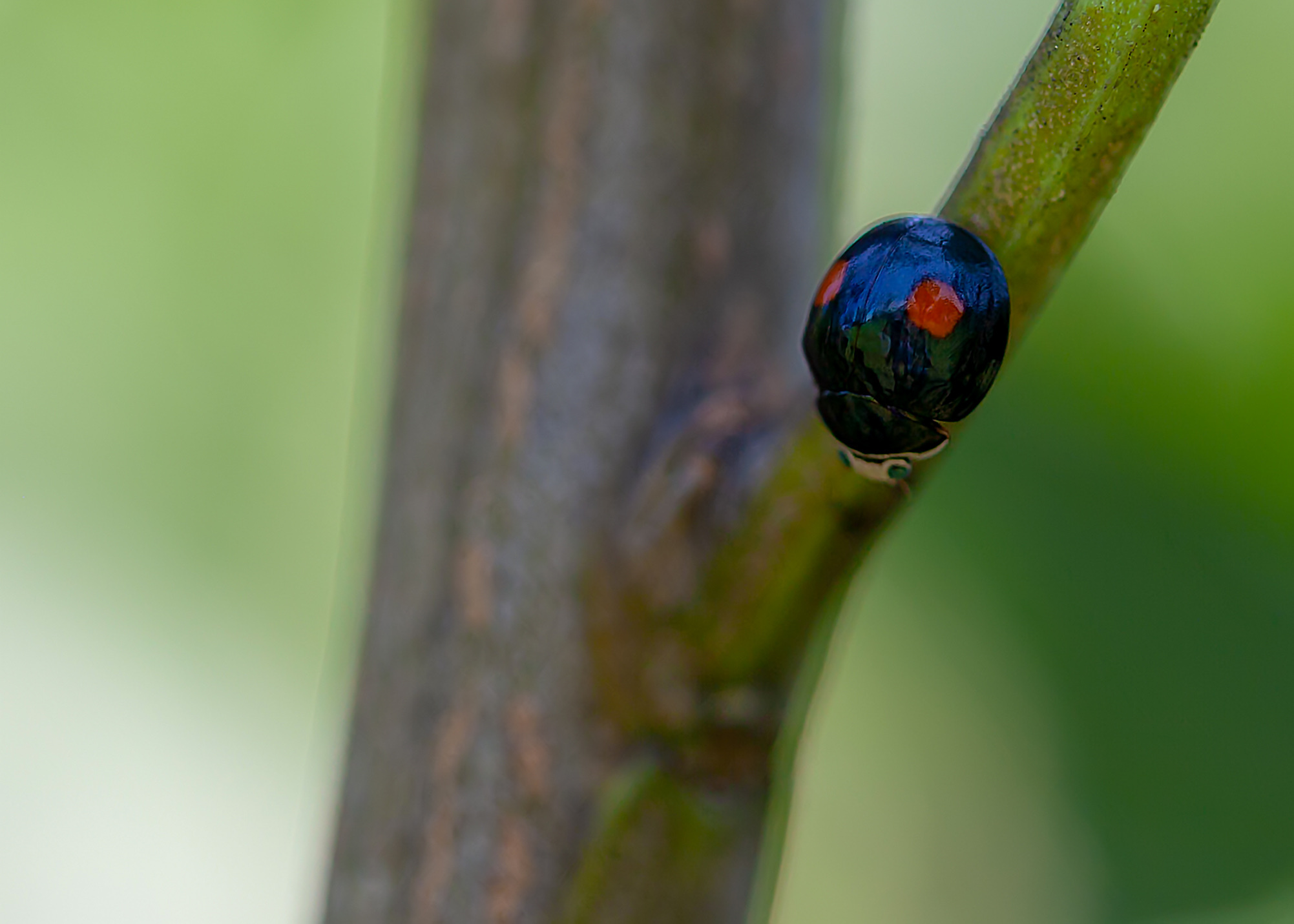
- Thalassa montezumae

Scientific classification
- Kingdom: Animalia
- Phylum: Arthropoda
- Class: Insecta
- Order: Coleoptera
- Suborder: Polyphaga
- Infraorder: Cucujiformia
- Family: Coccinellidae
- Tribe: Hyperaspidini
- Genus: Thalassa; Mulsant, 1850

= Thalassa (beetle) =

Genus of beetles

Thalassa is a genus of lady beetles in the family Coccinellidae. There are at least six described species in Thalassa.

== Species ==
These species belong to the genus Thalassa:

- Thalassa flaviceps Mulsant, 1850
- Thalassa glauca (Mulsant, 1850)
- Thalassa korschefskyi (Milléo, Almeida & Gordon, 2004)
- Thalassa montezumae Mulsant, 1850 (Montezuma lady beetle)
- Thalassa pentaspilota (Chevrolat, 1853)
- Thalassa similaris Mulsant, 1850
