= Hyperaspis onerata =

Scientific classification
- Kingdom: Animalia
- Phylum: Arthropoda
- Clade: Pancrustacea
- Class: Insecta
- Order: Coleoptera
- Suborder: Polyphaga
- Infraorder: Cucujiformia
- Family: Coccinellidae
- Genus: Hyperaspis
- Species: H. onerata

Binomial name
- Hyperaspis onerata (Mulsant, 1850)

Synonyms
- Cleothera onerata Mulsant, 1850

Species of beetle

Hyperaspis onerata is a species of beetle of the family Coccinellidae. It is found in northern South America and various Caribbean islands.

== Description ==
Adults reach a length of about 2.0-2.7 mm. They have a yellow body. The pronotum has two triangular black spots. The basal margin of the elytron is black, as is part of the sutural margin. The lateral margin is also partly black and there is one large oval discal spot on the sutural margin, as well as a small black oval spot and one large irregularly oval spot.
