= Hinda ecuadorica =

Scientific classification
- Kingdom: Animalia
- Phylum: Arthropoda
- Clade: Pancrustacea
- Class: Insecta
- Order: Coleoptera
- Suborder: Polyphaga
- Infraorder: Cucujiformia
- Family: Coccinellidae
- Genus: Hinda
- Species: H. ecuadorica

Binomial name
- Hinda ecuadorica Gordon & Canepari, 2013

Species of beetle

Hinda ecuadorica is a species of beetle of the family Coccinellidae. It is found in Ecuador.

== Description ==
Adults reach a length of about 3 mm. They have a yellow body. The pronotum has a black marking with a V-shaped yellow indentation. The elytron is black with four large yellow spots.

== Etymology ==
The species is named for the country of origin.
