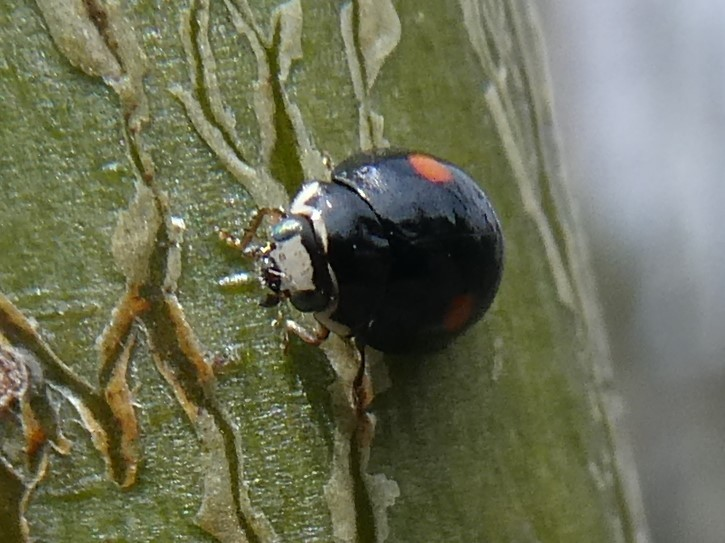

Scientific classification
- Kingdom: Animalia
- Phylum: Arthropoda
- Clade: Pancrustacea
- Class: Insecta
- Order: Coleoptera
- Suborder: Polyphaga
- Infraorder: Cucujiformia
- Family: Coccinellidae
- Genus: Hyperaspis
- Species: H. binotata

Binomial name
- Hyperaspis binotata (Say, 1826)

Synonyms
- Coccinella binotata Say, 1827; Coccinella normata Say, 1827; Coccinella affinis Randall, 1838 (preocc.); Hyperaspis leucopsis Melsheimer, 1847; Hyperaspis paspalis Watson, 1960

= Hyperaspis binotata =

Species of beetle

Hyperaspis binotata is a species of lady beetle in the family Coccinellidae. It is found in North America, where it has been recorded from Maine and Quebec to North Carolina, west to North Dakota and Louisiana.

== Description ==
Adults reach a length of about 2.40-4.50 mm. The pronotum of the males is yellow on the lateral and anterior margins, while the pronotum of the females is black. The elytron is black with a red spot.
