= Helesius nigripennis =

Scientific classification
- Kingdom: Animalia
- Phylum: Arthropoda
- Class: Insecta
- Order: Coleoptera
- Suborder: Polyphaga
- Infraorder: Cucujiformia
- Family: Coccinellidae
- Genus: Helesius
- Species: H. nigripennis

Binomial name
- Helesius nigripennis (LeConte, 1878)

Synonyms
- Scymnus nigripennis LeConte, 1878

Species of beetle

Helesius nigripennis is a species of lady beetle in the family Coccinellidae. It is found in North America, where it has been recorded from Colorado and Montana.

== Description ==
Adults reach a length of about 2.45–3 mm. They have a red head and the lateral one-third of the pronotum is red with a faint reddish brown area. The elytron is black or dark brown.
