= Selvadius megacephalus =

Scientific classification
- Kingdom: Animalia
- Phylum: Arthropoda
- Class: Insecta
- Order: Coleoptera
- Suborder: Polyphaga
- Infraorder: Cucujiformia
- Family: Coccinellidae
- Genus: Selvadius
- Species: S. megacephalus

Binomial name
- Selvadius megacephalus (Fall, 1901)

Synonyms
- Scymnus megacephalus Fall, 1901

Species of beetle

Selvadius megacephalus is a species of beetle of the family Coccinellidae. It is found in North America, where it has been recorded from California, Arizona and New Mexico.

== Description ==
Adults reach a length of about 2.0–2.25 mm. They have a reddish brown body, except for a dark brown sutural margin.
