= Tenuisvalvae notata =

Scientific classification
- Kingdom: Animalia
- Phylum: Arthropoda
- Class: Insecta
- Order: Coleoptera
- Suborder: Polyphaga
- Infraorder: Cucujiformia
- Family: Coccinellidae
- Genus: Tenuisvalvae
- Species: T. notata

Binomial name
- Tenuisvalvae notata (Mulsant, 1850)

Synonyms
- Cleothera notata Mulsant, 1850

Species of beetle

Tenuisvalvae notata is a species of beetle of the family Coccinellidae. It is found in Central America and northern South America.

== Description ==
Adults reach a length of about 3.0-3.4 mm. They have a yellow body. The pronotum has three black markings. The elytron has four black spots and the sutural margin is also black.
