= Diazonema eccentrica =

Scientific classification
- Kingdom: Animalia
- Phylum: Arthropoda
- Class: Insecta
- Order: Coleoptera
- Suborder: Polyphaga
- Infraorder: Cucujiformia
- Family: Coccinellidae
- Genus: Diazonema
- Species: D. eccentrica

Binomial name
- Diazonema eccentrica Gordon & Canepari, 2008

Species of beetle

Diazonema eccentrica is a species of beetle of the family Coccinellidae. It is found in Colombia.

== Description ==
Adults reach a length of about 2.7 mm. They have a black body, the head with a brown spot. The anterior margin and lateral one-fourth of the pronotum are yellow. The elytron has a pale red spot, one small oval yellow spot and one yellow spot.

== Etymology ==
The species name is derived from Latin eccentricus (meaning different, odd) and refers to the different appearance of this species compared to other species of Diazonema.
