= Hinda decas =

Scientific classification
- Kingdom: Animalia
- Phylum: Arthropoda
- Clade: Pancrustacea
- Class: Insecta
- Order: Coleoptera
- Suborder: Polyphaga
- Infraorder: Cucujiformia
- Family: Coccinellidae
- Genus: Hinda
- Species: H. decas

Binomial name
- Hinda decas Weise, 1902

Species of beetle

Hinda decas is a species of beetle of the family Coccinellidae. It is found in Colombia.

== Description ==
Adults reach a length of about 3.7 mm. They have a yellow body, with some light and dark brown on the head. The pronotum has a dark brown border, two dark brown bands and a small brown spot. The elytron is dark brown with five large yellow spots.
