= Tiphysa egae =

Scientific classification
- Kingdom: Animalia
- Phylum: Arthropoda
- Clade: Pancrustacea
- Class: Insecta
- Order: Coleoptera
- Suborder: Polyphaga
- Infraorder: Cucujiformia
- Family: Coccinellidae
- Genus: Tiphysa
- Species: T. egae

Binomial name
- Tiphysa egae Crotch, 1874

Species of beetle

Tiphysa egae is a species of beetle of the Coccinellidae family. It is found in Brazil.

== Description ==
Adults reach a length of about 4 mm. They have a black body. The pronotum is dull black with a metallic bluish green tinge and yellow borders. The elytron is shiny black with metallic green tinge.
