= Hyperaspis caseyi =

Scientific classification
- Kingdom: Animalia
- Phylum: Arthropoda
- Clade: Pancrustacea
- Class: Insecta
- Order: Coleoptera
- Suborder: Polyphaga
- Infraorder: Cucujiformia
- Family: Coccinellidae
- Genus: Hyperaspis
- Species: H. caseyi

Binomial name
- Hyperaspis caseyi Gordon, 1985

Species of beetle

Hyperaspis caseyi is a species of lady beetle in the family Coccinellidae. It is found in North America, where it has been recorded from Texas, Arizona, New Mexico, Washington and Colorado.

== Description ==
Adults reach a length of about 2.30 mm (males) and 2.70 mm (females). The pronotum is yellow on the apical and lateral border. The elytron is black with a lateral vitta.
