= Tenuisvalvae peregrina =

Scientific classification
- Kingdom: Animalia
- Phylum: Arthropoda
- Class: Insecta
- Order: Coleoptera
- Suborder: Polyphaga
- Infraorder: Cucujiformia
- Family: Coccinellidae
- Genus: Tenuisvalvae
- Species: T. peregrina

Binomial name
- Tenuisvalvae peregrina (Mulsant, 1850)

Synonyms
- Hyperaspis peregrina Mulsant, 1850; Hyperaspis subapicalis Crotch, 1874

Species of beetle

Tenuisvalvae peregrina is a species of beetle of the family Coccinellidae. It is found in Brazil.

== Description ==
Adults reach a length of about 3 mm. They have a black body. The anterolateral one-fourth of the pronotum is yellow. The elytron has a large round yellow spot.
