= Thalassa korschefskyi =

Scientific classification
- Kingdom: Animalia
- Phylum: Arthropoda
- Class: Insecta
- Order: Coleoptera
- Suborder: Polyphaga
- Infraorder: Cucujiformia
- Family: Coccinellidae
- Genus: Thalassa
- Species: T. korschefskyi

Binomial name
- Thalassa korschefskyi (Milléo, Almeida & Gordon, 2004)

Synonyms
- Hyperaspis korschefskyi Milléo, Almeida & Gordon, 2004

Species of beetle

Thalassa korschefskyi is a species of beetle of the family Coccinellidae. It is found in Colombia.
