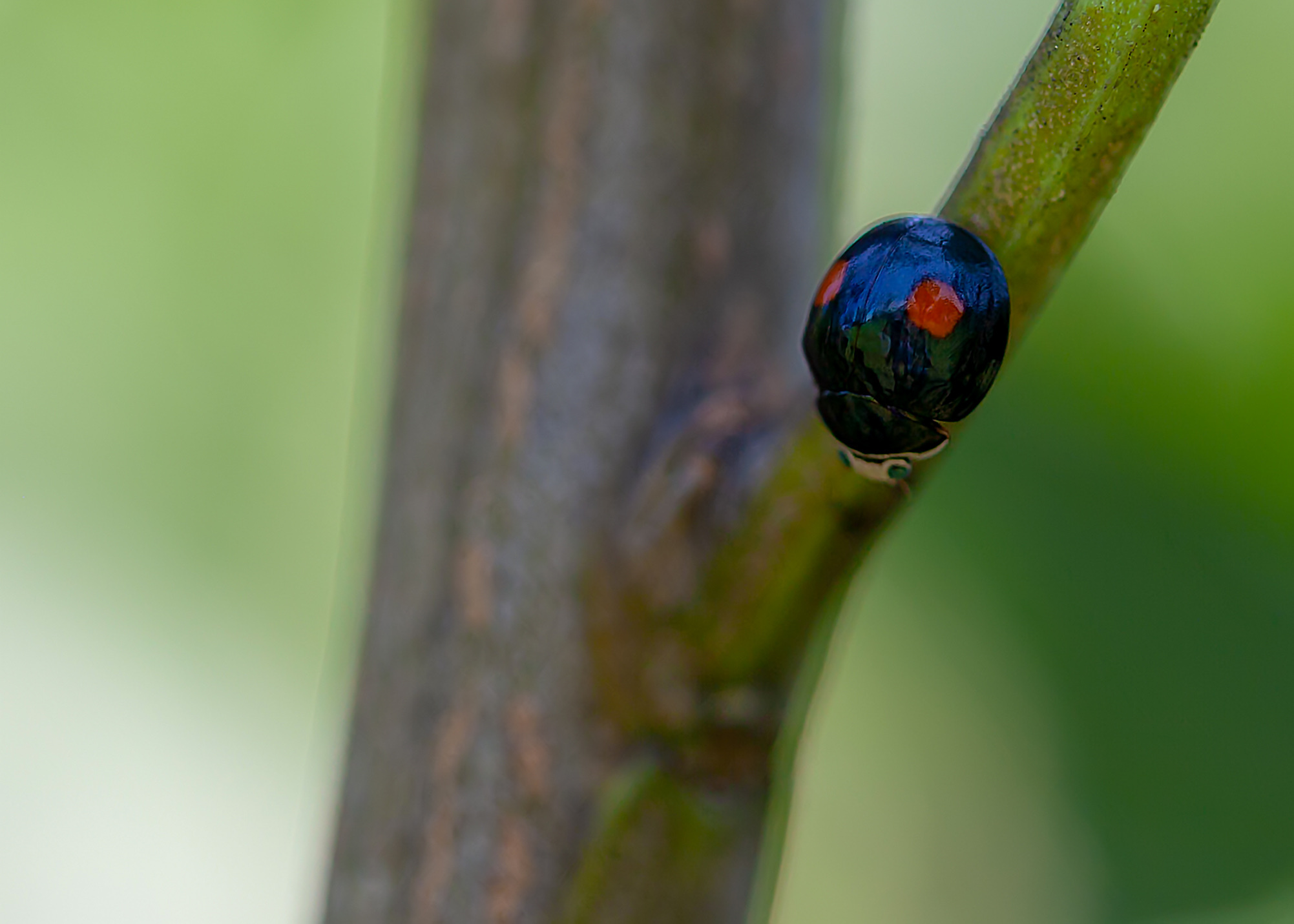

Scientific classification
- Kingdom: Animalia
- Phylum: Arthropoda
- Class: Insecta
- Order: Coleoptera
- Suborder: Polyphaga
- Infraorder: Cucujiformia
- Family: Coccinellidae
- Genus: Thalassa
- Species: T. montezumae

Binomial name
- Thalassa montezumae Mulsant, 1850

= Thalassa montezumae =

Species of beetle

Thalassa montezumae, the Montezuma lady beetle, is a species of beetle of the family Coccinellidae. It is found in the United States, Mexico and Guatemala.

== Description ==
Adults reach a length of about 4.50-5.80 mm. The pronotum of the males is bluish black, with yellow anterior and lateral margins. The female pronotum is bluish black with a very faint yellow anterolateral angle. The elytron is bluish black with a reddish yellow spot.
