= Hinda decemverrucata =

Scientific classification
- Kingdom: Animalia
- Phylum: Arthropoda
- Clade: Pancrustacea
- Class: Insecta
- Order: Coleoptera
- Suborder: Polyphaga
- Infraorder: Cucujiformia
- Family: Coccinellidae
- Genus: Hinda
- Species: H. decemverrucata

Binomial name
- Hinda decemverrucata (Mulsant, 1850)

Synonyms
- Cleothera decem-verrucata Mulsant, 1850

Species of beetle

Hinda decemverrucata is a species of beetle of the family Coccinellidae. It is found in Colombia.

== Description ==
Adults reach a length of about 3.2 mm. They have a yellow body and a brownish yellow head. The pronotum is also brownish yellow and has a large round yellow spot, as well as an oval yellow spot. The elytron is light brown with five large yellow spots.
