= Clypeaspis =

Scientific classification
- Kingdom: Animalia
- Phylum: Arthropoda
- Class: Insecta
- Order: Coleoptera
- Suborder: Polyphaga
- Infraorder: Cucujiformia
- Family: Coccinellidae
- Subfamily: Coccinellinae
- Tribe: Hyperaspidini
- Genus: Clypeaspis; Gordon & Canepari, 2008

Genus of beetles

Clypeaspis is a genus of lady beetles in the family Coccinellidae.

== Species ==
- Clypeaspis trilineata (Mulsant, 1850)
