= Hyperaspidius andrewsi =

Scientific classification
- Kingdom: Animalia
- Phylum: Arthropoda
- Class: Insecta
- Order: Coleoptera
- Suborder: Polyphaga
- Infraorder: Cucujiformia
- Family: Coccinellidae
- Genus: Hyperaspidius
- Species: H. andrewsi

Binomial name
- Hyperaspidius andrewsi Gordon, 1985

Species of beetle

Hyperaspidius andrewsi is a species of beetle of the family Coccinellidae. It is found in North America, where it has been recorded from Utah.

== Description ==
Adults reach a length of about 2.10 mm (males) and 2.35 mm (females). The head and pronotum of the males are yellow, the pronotum with a black base medially and four spots in the basal area. The elytron is yellow with a black sutural margin and a black vitta. Females are similar to males, but have a black head and they have a black pronotum with the except lateral one-third and a small spot yellow.

== Etymology ==
The species is named for one of the collectors of the type series.
