= Hyperaspidius transfugatus =

Scientific classification
- Kingdom: Animalia
- Phylum: Arthropoda
- Class: Insecta
- Order: Coleoptera
- Suborder: Polyphaga
- Infraorder: Cucujiformia
- Family: Coccinellidae
- Genus: Hyperaspidius
- Species: H. transfugatus

Binomial name
- Hyperaspidius transfugatus Casey, 1899

Synonyms
- Hyperaspidius pallidus Casey, 1924; Hyperaspidius horni Nunenmacher, 1934

Species of beetle

Hyperaspidius transfugatus is a species of lady beetle in the family Coccinellidae. It is found in North America, where it has been recorded from Massachusetts, Minnesota, New Jersey and North Carolina.

== Description ==
Adults reach a length of about 1.90-2.10 mm. Adults have a yellowish brown pronotum, while the elytron is yellow with a darkened sutural margin.
