= Tenuisvalvae comma =

Scientific classification
- Kingdom: Animalia
- Phylum: Arthropoda
- Class: Insecta
- Order: Coleoptera
- Suborder: Polyphaga
- Infraorder: Cucujiformia
- Family: Coccinellidae
- Genus: Tenuisvalvae
- Species: T. comma

Binomial name
- Tenuisvalvae comma González, 2015

Species of beetle

Tenuisvalvae comma is a species of beetle of the family Coccinellidae. It is found in Ecuador.

== Description ==
Adults reach a length of about 2.7 mm. Adults are black with a yellowish brown head. The lateral margins of the pronotum are yellow and there are five yellow spots on the elytron. Three of these spots form a comma-shaped line.
