= Hyperaspidius marginatus =

Scientific classification
- Kingdom: Animalia
- Phylum: Arthropoda
- Class: Insecta
- Order: Coleoptera
- Suborder: Polyphaga
- Infraorder: Cucujiformia
- Family: Coccinellidae
- Genus: Hyperaspidius
- Species: H. marginatus

Binomial name
- Hyperaspidius marginatus (Gaines, 1933)

Synonyms
- Hyperaspis fimbriolata marginatus Gaines, 1933

Species of beetle

Hyperaspidius marginatus is a species of lady beetle in the family Coccinellidae. It is found in North America, where it has been recorded from Texas.

== Description ==
Adults reach a length of about 1.75-2.40 mm. Both males and females have a yellow or brownish yellow head. The pronotum is reddish brown with nebulous brown spots in male and some females, while other females have a dark brown pronotum with a yellow lateral border. The elytron is dark brown or black with a yellow vitta.
