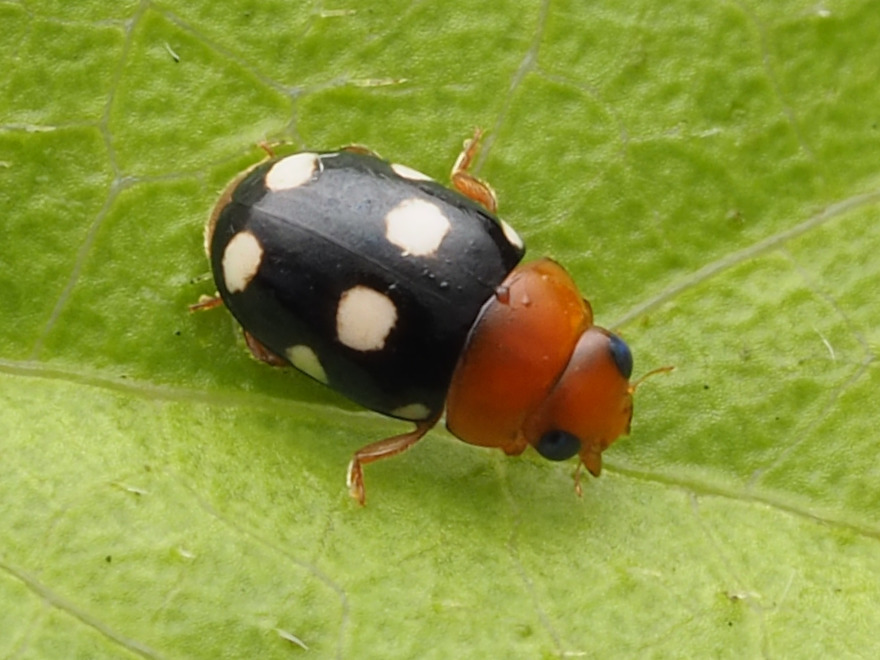

Scientific classification
- Kingdom: Animalia
- Phylum: Arthropoda
- Class: Insecta
- Order: Coleoptera
- Suborder: Polyphaga
- Infraorder: Cucujiformia
- Family: Coccinellidae
- Genus: Hyperaspidius
- Species: H. venustulus

Binomial name
- Hyperaspidius venustulus (Mulsant, 1850)

Synonyms
- Hyperaspis venustula Mulsant, 1850

= Hyperaspidius venustulus =

Species of beetle

Hyperaspidius venustulus is a species of lady beetle in the family Coccinellidae. It is found in North America, where it has been recorded from Georgia.

== Description ==
Adults reach a length of about 2.80 mm. The pronotum is yellowish red and the elytron is black with four yellow spots.
