= Mimoscymnus laticlavus =

Scientific classification
- Kingdom: Animalia
- Phylum: Arthropoda
- Class: Insecta
- Order: Coleoptera
- Suborder: Polyphaga
- Infraorder: Cucujiformia
- Family: Coccinellidae
- Genus: Mimoscymnus
- Species: M. laticlavus

Binomial name
- Mimoscymnus laticlavus Gordon, 2002

Species of beetle

Mimoscymnus laticlavus is a species of beetle of the family Coccinellidae. It is found in Chile.

== Description ==
Adults reach a length of about 1.7–2.2 mm. Adults are black, but the head and pronotum are reddish yellow. The elytron has a broad yellow vitta.

== Etymology ==
The species name is derived from Latin laticlavus (meaning broad stripe) and refers to the elytral colour pattern.
