= Mimoscymnus rossi =

Scientific classification
- Kingdom: Animalia
- Phylum: Arthropoda
- Class: Insecta
- Order: Coleoptera
- Suborder: Polyphaga
- Infraorder: Cucujiformia
- Family: Coccinellidae
- Genus: Mimoscymnus
- Species: M. rossi

Binomial name
- Mimoscymnus rossi Gordon, 2002

Species of beetle

Mimoscymnus rossi is a species of beetle of the family Coccinellidae. It is found in Peru.

== Description ==
Adults reach a length of about 2.5 mm. Adults are brown, although the head, pronotum, apical one-sixth of the elytron and legs are yellow.

== Etymology ==
The species is named for the collector of the holotype.
