= Menoscelis insignis =

Scientific classification
- Kingdom: Animalia
- Phylum: Arthropoda
- Class: Insecta
- Order: Coleoptera
- Suborder: Polyphaga
- Infraorder: Cucujiformia
- Family: Coccinellidae
- Genus: Menoscelis
- Species: M. insignis

Binomial name
- Menoscelis insignis Mulsant, 1850

Species of beetle

Menoscelis insignis is a species of beetle of the family Coccinellidae. It is found in French Guiana.

== Description ==
Adults reach a length of about 7.5 mm. They have a yellow body. The median one-third of the pronotum is reddish brown. There are three yellow spots on this reddish brown area. The elytron is reddish brown with five large yellow spots.
