= Mimoscymnus guascaensis =

Scientific classification
- Kingdom: Animalia
- Phylum: Arthropoda
- Class: Insecta
- Order: Coleoptera
- Suborder: Polyphaga
- Infraorder: Cucujiformia
- Family: Coccinellidae
- Genus: Mimoscymnus
- Species: M. guascaensis

Binomial name
- Mimoscymnus guascaensis Gordon, 2002

Species of beetle

Mimoscymnus guascaensis is a species of beetle of the family Coccinellidae. It is found in Colombia.

== Description ==
Adults reach a length of about 2-2.4 mm. Adults are black with reddish brown legs.

== Etymology ==
The species is named for the type locality.
