= Diazonema fallax =

Scientific classification
- Kingdom: Animalia
- Phylum: Arthropoda
- Class: Insecta
- Order: Coleoptera
- Suborder: Polyphaga
- Infraorder: Cucujiformia
- Family: Coccinellidae
- Genus: Diazonema
- Species: D. fallax

Binomial name
- Diazonema fallax Weise, 1926

Species of beetle

Diazonema fallax is a species of beetle of the family Coccinellidae. It is found in Peru.

== Description ==
Adults reach a length of about 4.5–4.7 mm. They have a yellow body. The pronotum has five reddish brown spots. The elytron is pale red with a yellow border .
