= Mimoscymnus =

Scientific classification
- Kingdom: Animalia
- Phylum: Arthropoda
- Class: Insecta
- Order: Coleoptera
- Suborder: Polyphaga
- Infraorder: Cucujiformia
- Family: Coccinellidae
- Subfamily: Coccinellinae
- Tribe: Hyperaspidini
- Genus: Mimoscymnus; Gordon, 1994

Genus of beetles

Mimoscymnus is a genus of lady beetles in the family Coccinellidae.

== Species ==
- Mimoscymnus aeneus
- Mimoscymnus anthracinus
- Mimoscymnus brevicapillus
- Mimoscymnus caucaensis
- Mimoscymnus decorus
- Mimoscymnus electus
- Mimoscymnus gonzalezi
- Mimoscymnus guascaensis
- Mimoscymnus howdenorum
- Mimoscymnus islanegrensis
- Mimoscymnus laticlavus
- Mimoscymnus macula
- Mimoscymnus praeclarus
- Mimoscymnus pseudomacula
- Mimoscymnus purpureus
- Mimoscymnus ramosi
- Mimoscymnus rossi
- Mimoscymnus solus
- Mimoscymnus terminatus
- Mimoscymnus variegatus
