= Mimoscymnus decorus =

Scientific classification
- Kingdom: Animalia
- Phylum: Arthropoda
- Class: Insecta
- Order: Coleoptera
- Suborder: Polyphaga
- Infraorder: Cucujiformia
- Family: Coccinellidae
- Genus: Mimoscymnus
- Species: M. decorus

Binomial name
- Mimoscymnus decorus Gordon, 2002

Species of beetle

Mimoscymnus decorus is a species of beetle of the family Coccinellidae. It is found in Chile.

== Description ==
Adults reach a length of about 1.7–1.8 mm. Adults are reddish yellow, although the elytron is dark brown with three spots.

== Etymology ==
The species is named for the complex elytral colour pattern.
