= Tiphysa plumbea =

Scientific classification
- Kingdom: Animalia
- Phylum: Arthropoda
- Clade: Pancrustacea
- Class: Insecta
- Order: Coleoptera
- Suborder: Polyphaga
- Infraorder: Cucujiformia
- Family: Coccinellidae
- Genus: Tiphysa
- Species: T. plumbea

Binomial name
- Tiphysa plumbea Mulsant, 1850

Species of beetle

Tiphysa plumbea is a species of beetle of the Coccinellidae family. It is found in French Guiana.

== Description ==
Adults reach a length of about 5-5.2 mm. They have a black body. The pronotum is dull black with a metallic green tinge and yellow borders. The elytron is shiny black with a metallic green tinge.
