= Mimoscymnus howdenorum =

Scientific classification
- Kingdom: Animalia
- Phylum: Arthropoda
- Class: Insecta
- Order: Coleoptera
- Suborder: Polyphaga
- Infraorder: Cucujiformia
- Family: Coccinellidae
- Genus: Mimoscymnus
- Species: M. howdenorum

Binomial name
- Mimoscymnus howdenorum Gordon, 2002

Species of beetle

Mimoscymnus howdenorum is a species of beetle of the family Coccinellidae. It is found in Colombia and Venezuela.

== Description ==
Adults reach a length of about 2-2.4 mm. Adults are black, although the head and apical one-fourth of the elytron are yellow and the pronotum is yellow with a small spot.

== Etymology ==
The species is named for the collectors of part of the type series.
