= Hyperaspidius simulatus =

Scientific classification
- Kingdom: Animalia
- Phylum: Arthropoda
- Class: Insecta
- Order: Coleoptera
- Suborder: Polyphaga
- Infraorder: Cucujiformia
- Family: Coccinellidae
- Genus: Hyperaspidius
- Species: H. simulatus

Binomial name
- Hyperaspidius simulatus Gordon, 1985

Species of beetle

Hyperaspidius simulatus is a species of lady beetle in the family Coccinellidae. It is found in North America, where it has been recorded from California.

== Description ==
Adults reach a length of about 1.6-1.7 mm. They have a yellow head and the pronotum is brown with a yellow lateral anterior margin. The elytron is brown with lateral and discal vittae.

== Etymology ==
The species is named is derived from Latin similis and refers to the similarity in dorsal color pattern to several other species of Hyperaspidius.
