= Diazonema boothi =

Scientific classification
- Kingdom: Animalia
- Phylum: Arthropoda
- Class: Insecta
- Order: Coleoptera
- Suborder: Polyphaga
- Infraorder: Cucujiformia
- Family: Coccinellidae
- Genus: Diazonema
- Species: D. boothi

Binomial name
- Diazonema boothi Gordon & Canepari, 2008

Species of beetle

Diazonema boothi is a species of beetle of the family Coccinellidae. It is found in Ecuador.

== Description ==
Adults reach a length of about 5.2 mm. They have a yellow body, the head with dark brown areas. The pronotum has five indistinct brown spots. The elytron is pale reddish yellow, becoming slightly paler towards the lateral and apical borders.

== Etymology ==
The species is named in honour of Roger Booth, a colleague of the authors who has contributed greatly to their coccinellid studies.
