= Hyperaspidius hercules =

Scientific classification
- Kingdom: Animalia
- Phylum: Arthropoda
- Class: Insecta
- Order: Coleoptera
- Suborder: Polyphaga
- Infraorder: Cucujiformia
- Family: Coccinellidae
- Genus: Hyperaspidius
- Species: H. hercules

Binomial name
- Hyperaspidius hercules Belicek, 1976

Species of beetle

Hyperaspidius hercules is a species of beetle of the family Coccinellidae. It is found in North America, where it has been recorded from Alberta, Colorado, Idaho, Montana, Nevada, Utah and Wyoming.

== Description ==
Adults reach a length of about 2.10–4.00 mm. The pronotum of the males is yellow with black spots in the basal area, while the female pronotum is black with a faint yellow lateral margin. The elytron is black with a yellow vitta on the anterior and lateral borders and a discal vitta.
