= Hyperaspidius nanellus =

Scientific classification
- Kingdom: Animalia
- Phylum: Arthropoda
- Class: Insecta
- Order: Coleoptera
- Suborder: Polyphaga
- Infraorder: Cucujiformia
- Family: Coccinellidae
- Genus: Hyperaspidius
- Species: H. nanellus

Binomial name
- Hyperaspidius nanellus Gordon, 1985

Species of beetle

Hyperaspidius nanellus is a species of lady beetle in the family Coccinellidae. It is found in North America, where it has been recorded from Texas.

== Description ==
Adults reach a length of about 2 mm. They have a yellow head yellow and the pronotum is yellow with obscure brownish yellow spots in the basal one-third. The elytron is yellow.
