= Cleothera buqueti =

Scientific classification
- Kingdom: Animalia
- Phylum: Arthropoda
- Class: Insecta
- Order: Coleoptera
- Suborder: Polyphaga
- Infraorder: Cucujiformia
- Family: Coccinellidae
- Genus: Cleothera (beetle)
- Species: C. buqueti

Binomial name
- Cleothera buqueti Mulsant, 1850

Synonyms
- Cleothera (Cleothera) buqueti Mulsant, 1850

Species of beetle

Cleothera buqueti is a species of beetle of the family Coccinellidae. It is found in Brazil.

== Description ==
Adults reach a length of about 5–6 mm. They have a yellow body. Typically, the pronotum has a black basal margin and a black area, as a number of black spots. However, this colour pattern is highly variable. The elytron has six small black spots.
