= Tenuisvalvae bromelicola =

Scientific classification
- Kingdom: Animalia
- Phylum: Arthropoda
- Class: Insecta
- Order: Coleoptera
- Suborder: Polyphaga
- Infraorder: Cucujiformia
- Family: Coccinellidae
- Genus: Tenuisvalvae
- Species: T. bromelicola

Binomial name
- Tenuisvalvae bromelicola (Sicard, 1925)

Synonyms
- Cleothera bromelicola Sicard, 1925

Species of beetle

Tenuisvalvae bromelicola is a species of beetle of the family Coccinellidae. It is found in Colombia, Ecuador and Panama.

== Description ==
Adults reach a length of about 2.6–3.1 mm. They have a black body and yellow head. The pronotum is yellow with a black basomedian spot. The elytron has three yellow spots.
