= Mimoscymnus gonzalezi =

Scientific classification
- Kingdom: Animalia
- Phylum: Arthropoda
- Class: Insecta
- Order: Coleoptera
- Suborder: Polyphaga
- Infraorder: Cucujiformia
- Family: Coccinellidae
- Genus: Mimoscymnus
- Species: M. gonzalezi

Binomial name
- Mimoscymnus gonzalezi Gordon, 2002

Species of beetle

Mimoscymnus gonzalezi is a species of beetle in the family Coccinellidae. It is found in Chile.

== Description ==
Adults reach a length of about 1.7–2 mm. Adults are brown, but the apical half of the head and lateral one-sixth of the pronotum is reddish brown. The elytron has a discal spot and a yellow spot.

== Etymology ==
The species is named for Guillermo Gonzalez, collector of part of the type series.
