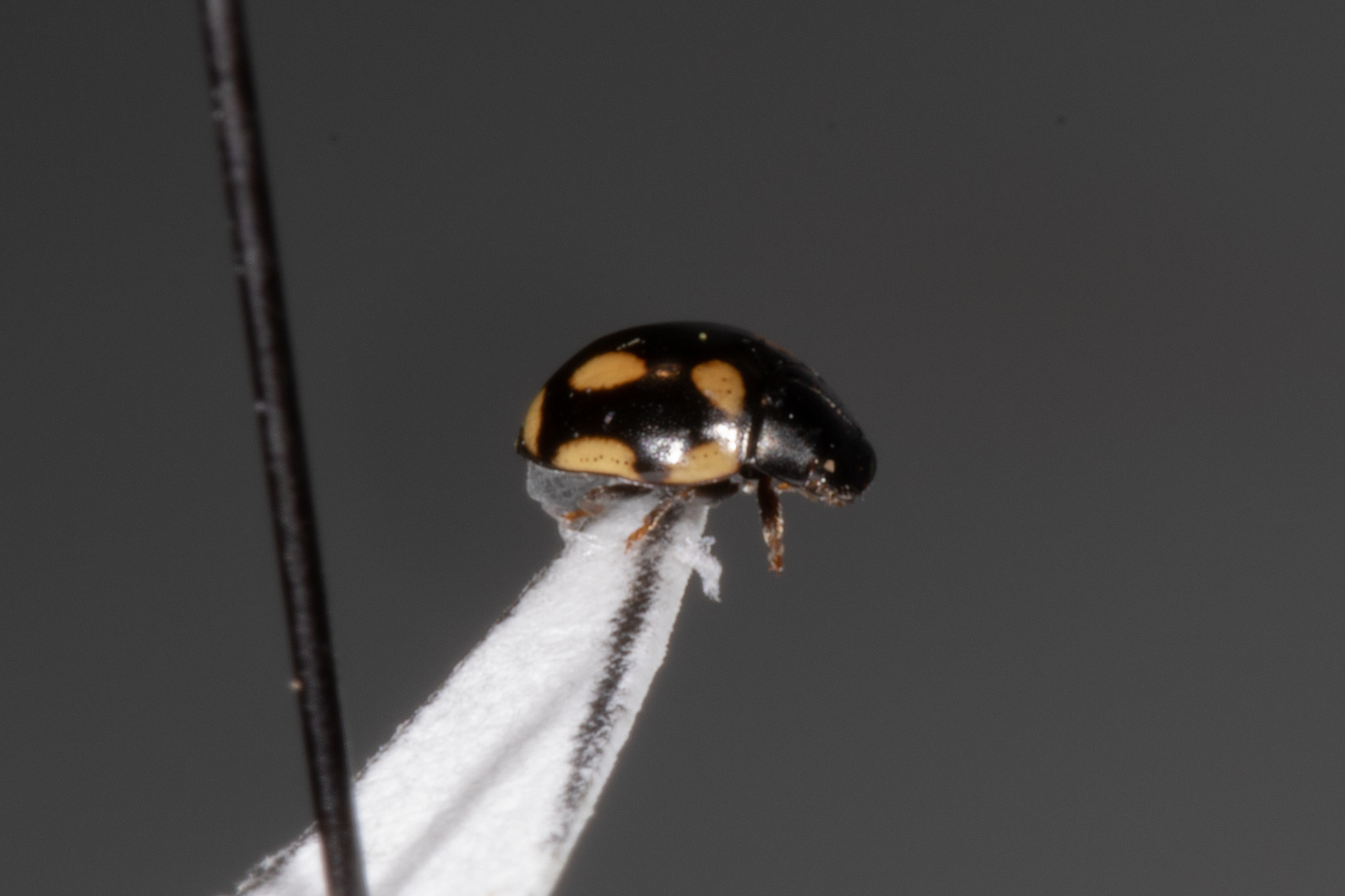

Scientific classification
- Kingdom: Animalia
- Phylum: Arthropoda
- Clade: Pancrustacea
- Class: Insecta
- Order: Coleoptera
- Suborder: Polyphaga
- Infraorder: Cucujiformia
- Family: Coccinellidae
- Genus: Hyperaspis
- Species: H. disconotata

Binomial name
- Hyperaspis disconotata Mulsant, 1850

= Hyperaspis disconotata =

Species of beetle

Hyperaspis disconotata, the disk-marked lady beetle, is a species of lady beetle in the family Coccinellidae. It is found in North America, where it has been recorded from Alberta, Quebec, Massachusetts, Minnesota, New York and Wisconsin.

== Description ==
Adults reach a length of about 2.30-2.80 mm. The elytron has five yellow spots.
