= Tenuisvalvae =

Scientific classification
- Kingdom: Animalia
- Phylum: Arthropoda
- Class: Insecta
- Order: Coleoptera
- Suborder: Polyphaga
- Infraorder: Cucujiformia
- Family: Coccinellidae
- Subfamily: Coccinellinae
- Tribe: Hyperaspidini
- Genus: Tenuisvalvae; Duverger, 1989

Genus of beetles

Tenuisvalvae is a genus of lady beetles in the family Coccinellidae.

== Species ==
- Tenuisvalvae bisquinquepustulata (Fabricius, 1801)
- Tenuisvalvae bromelicola (Sicard, 1925)
- Tenuisvalvae caucaensis Gordon & Canepari, 2008
- Tenuisvalvae comma González, 2015
- Tenuisvalvae deyrollei (Crotch, 1874)
- Tenuisvalvae ecoffeti Mulsant, 1853
- Tenuisvalvae gnoma Gordon & Canepari, 2008
- Tenuisvalvae notata (Mulsant, 1850)
- Tenuisvalvae parenthesis Gordon & Canepari, 2008
- Tenuisvalvae peregrina (Mulsant, 1850)
- Tenuisvalvae quadripunctata Santos & Almeida, 2017
- Tenuisvalvae rosariensis (Gordon & Canepari, 2008)
- Tenuisvalvae unipunctata (Crotch, 1874)
