= Hyperaspidius tristis =

Scientific classification
- Kingdom: Animalia
- Phylum: Arthropoda
- Class: Insecta
- Order: Coleoptera
- Suborder: Polyphaga
- Infraorder: Cucujiformia
- Family: Coccinellidae
- Genus: Hyperaspidius
- Species: H. tristis

Binomial name
- Hyperaspidius tristis (LeConte, 1880)

Synonyms
- Hyperaspis tristis LeConte, 1880; Hyperaspidius conspiratus Casey, 1899

Species of beetle

Hyperaspidius tristis is a species of lady beetle in the family Coccinellidae. It is found in North America, where it has been recorded from California.

== Description ==
Adults reach a length of about 1.60–2 mm. The head of the males is brown or yellowish brown, while females have a dark brown head. The pronotum of both males and females is dark brown with a yellow or yellowish brown lateral margin. The elytron is dark brown with a yellow lateral margin and apical yellow spot.
