= Hyperaspidius flavocephalus =

Scientific classification
- Kingdom: Animalia
- Phylum: Arthropoda
- Class: Insecta
- Order: Coleoptera
- Suborder: Polyphaga
- Infraorder: Cucujiformia
- Family: Coccinellidae
- Genus: Hyperaspidius
- Species: H. flavocephalus

Binomial name
- Hyperaspidius flavocephalus Blatchley, 1924

Species of beetle

Hyperaspidius flavocephalus is a species of beetle in the family Coccinellidae. It is found in North America, where it has been recorded from Florida.

== Description ==
Adults reach a length of about 2 mm. The pronotum of the males is reddish yellow with an obscure brown marking the basal area. The elytron is black, although part of the humeral angle is yellow.
