= Hyperaspidius vittigerus =

Scientific classification
- Kingdom: Animalia
- Phylum: Arthropoda
- Class: Insecta
- Order: Coleoptera
- Suborder: Polyphaga
- Infraorder: Cucujiformia
- Family: Coccinellidae
- Genus: Hyperaspidius
- Species: H. vittigerus

Binomial name
- Hyperaspidius vittigerus (LeConte, 1852)

Synonyms
- Hyperaspis vittigera LeConte, 1852; Hyperaspidius vittiger

Species of beetle

Hyperaspidius vittigerus, the vittate ladybug, is a species of hyperaspidius in the family Coccinellidae. It is found in North America, where it has been recorded from Alberta, Colorado, Idaho, Montana, New Mexico, North Dakota, South Dakota and Wyoming.

== Description ==
Adults reach a length of about 1.50-2.05 mm. The pronotum of the males is yellow with black spots in the basal area, while the female pronotum is dark brown or black with a yellow lateral margin. The elytron is black with a yellow vitta on the anterior and lateral borders and a discal vitta.
