= Tenuisvalvae gnoma =

Scientific classification
- Kingdom: Animalia
- Phylum: Arthropoda
- Class: Insecta
- Order: Coleoptera
- Suborder: Polyphaga
- Infraorder: Cucujiformia
- Family: Coccinellidae
- Genus: Tenuisvalvae
- Species: T. gnoma

Binomial name
- Tenuisvalvae gnoma Gordon & Canepari, 2008

Species of beetle

Tenuisvalvae gnoma is a species of beetle of the family Coccinellidae. It is found in Colombia.

== Description ==
Adults reach a length of about 3 mm. They have a black body and a head with a yellow u-shaped spot. The lateral one-third of the pronotum is yellow, while the elytron is pale red and bordered with black.

== Etymology ==
The species name is derived from Latin gnoma (meaning dwarf) and refers to the small size.
