= Selvadius nunenmacheri =

Scientific classification
- Kingdom: Animalia
- Phylum: Arthropoda
- Class: Insecta
- Order: Coleoptera
- Suborder: Polyphaga
- Infraorder: Cucujiformia
- Family: Coccinellidae
- Genus: Selvadius
- Species: S. nunenmacheri

Binomial name
- Selvadius nunenmacheri Gordon, 1970

Species of beetle

Selvadius nunenmacheri is a species of lady beetle in the family Coccinellidae. It is found in North America, where it has been recorded from Colorado.

== Description ==
Adults reach a length of about 1.55-2.35 mm.
