= Mimoscymnus solus =

Scientific classification
- Kingdom: Animalia
- Phylum: Arthropoda
- Class: Insecta
- Order: Coleoptera
- Suborder: Polyphaga
- Infraorder: Cucujiformia
- Family: Coccinellidae
- Genus: Mimoscymnus
- Species: M. solus

Binomial name
- Mimoscymnus solus Gordon, 2002

Species of beetle

Mimoscymnus solus is a species of beetle of the family Coccinellidae. It is found in Colombia.

== Description ==
Adults reach a length of about 2 mm. Adults are black, the elytron with a brassy sheen. The legs are dark brown.

== Etymology ==
The species name is derived from Latin solus (meaning alone) and refers to single type specimen.
