= Selvadius =

Scientific classification
- Kingdom: Animalia
- Phylum: Arthropoda
- Class: Insecta
- Order: Coleoptera
- Suborder: Polyphaga
- Infraorder: Cucujiformia
- Family: Coccinellidae
- Tribe: Hyperaspidini
- Genus: Selvadius; Casey, 1899

Genus of beetles

Selvadius is a genus of amber lady beetles in the family Coccinellidae. There are at least four described species in Selvadius.

== Species ==
These four species belong to the genus Selvadius:

- Selvadius maderi (Nunenmacher, 1937)
- Selvadius megacephalus (Fall, 1901)
- Selvadius nunenmacheri Gordon, 1970
- Selvadius rectus Casey, 1899
