= Hyperaspidius arcuatus =

Scientific classification
- Kingdom: Animalia
- Phylum: Arthropoda
- Class: Insecta
- Order: Coleoptera
- Suborder: Polyphaga
- Infraorder: Cucujiformia
- Family: Coccinellidae
- Genus: Hyperaspidius
- Species: H. arcuatus

Binomial name
- Hyperaspidius arcuatus (LeConte, 1852)

Synonyms
- Hyperaspis arcuata LeConte, 1852; Hyperaspidius rossi Nunenmacher, 1944

Species of beetle

Hyperaspidius arcuatus is a species of beetle of the family Coccinellidae. It is found in North America, where it has been recorded from California and Nevada.

== Description ==
Adults reach a length of about 1.60–2.00 mm. The pronotum is black with a yellow lateral margin. The elytron is black with yellow basal and lateral margins.
