= Peruaspis paprzyckii =

Scientific classification
- Kingdom: Animalia
- Phylum: Arthropoda
- Class: Insecta
- Order: Coleoptera
- Suborder: Polyphaga
- Infraorder: Cucujiformia
- Family: Coccinellidae
- Genus: Peruaspis
- Species: P. paprzyckii

Binomial name
- Peruaspis paprzyckii Gordon & Canepari, 2008

Species of beetle

Peruaspis paprzyckii is a species of beetle of the family Coccinellidae. It is found in Peru.

== Description ==
Adults reach a length of about 2.1 mm. They have a black body, the head mottled with yellow. The lateral one-third of the pronotum is yellow. The elytron has two yellow spots.

== Etymology ==
The species is named for the collector of the type series.
