= Clypeaspis trilineata =

Scientific classification
- Kingdom: Animalia
- Phylum: Arthropoda
- Class: Insecta
- Order: Coleoptera
- Suborder: Polyphaga
- Infraorder: Cucujiformia
- Family: Coccinellidae
- Genus: Clypeaspis
- Species: C. trilineata

Binomial name
- Clypeaspis trilineata (Mulsant, 1850)

Synonyms
- Hyperaspis trilineata Mulsant, 1850

Species of beetle

Clypeaspis trilineata is a species of beetle of the family Coccinellidae. It is found in South America (including Venezuela, Brazil and Argentina) and various Caribbean islands, where it seems most common on Barbados.

== Description ==
Adults reach a length of about 2.8–3.7 mm.
