= Mimoscymnus purpureus =

Scientific classification
- Kingdom: Animalia
- Phylum: Arthropoda
- Class: Insecta
- Order: Coleoptera
- Suborder: Polyphaga
- Infraorder: Cucujiformia
- Family: Coccinellidae
- Genus: Mimoscymnus
- Species: M. purpureus

Binomial name
- Mimoscymnus purpureus Gordon, 2002

Species of beetle

Mimoscymnus purpureus is a species of beetle of the family Coccinellidae. It is found in Colombia.

== Description ==
Adults reach a length of about 1.9–2.3 mm. Adults are black with a purple sheen.

== Etymology ==
The species name is derived from Latin purpureus (meaning purple) and refers to the purple sheen on the dorsal body surface.
