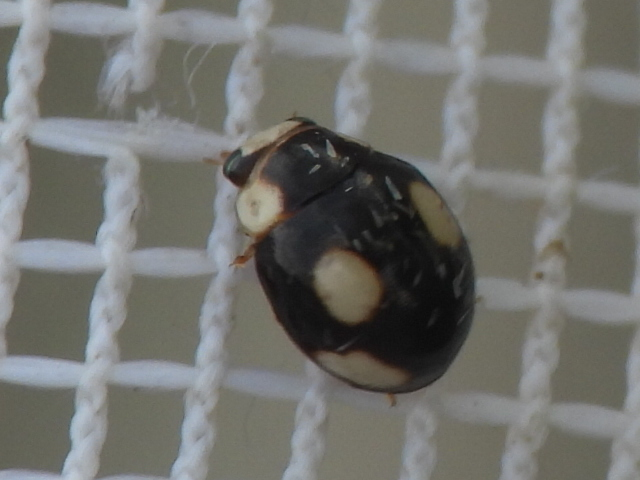

Scientific classification
- Kingdom: Animalia
- Phylum: Arthropoda
- Clade: Pancrustacea
- Class: Insecta
- Order: Coleoptera
- Suborder: Polyphaga
- Infraorder: Cucujiformia
- Family: Coccinellidae
- Genus: Hyperaspis
- Species: H. rotunda

Binomial name
- Hyperaspis rotunda Casey, 1899

= Hyperaspis rotunda =

Species of beetle

Hyperaspis rotunda is a species of lady beetle in the family Coccinellidae. It is found in North America, where it has been recorded from Texas.

== Description ==
Adults reach a length of about 2.20-2.80 mm. The pronotum is black with a lateral yellow area. The elytron has two yellow spots.
