= Mimoscymnus praeclarus =

Scientific classification
- Kingdom: Animalia
- Phylum: Arthropoda
- Class: Insecta
- Order: Coleoptera
- Suborder: Polyphaga
- Infraorder: Cucujiformia
- Family: Coccinellidae
- Genus: Mimoscymnus
- Species: M. praeclarus

Binomial name
- Mimoscymnus praeclarus Gordon, 2002

Species of beetle

Mimoscymnus praeclarus is a species of beetle in the family Coccinellidae. It is found in Chile.

== Description ==
Adults reach a length of about 2.3 mm. Adults are yellow, but the head and pronotum are pale reddish yellow. The elytron has six brown spots.

== Etymology ==
The species name is derived from Latin praeclarus (meaning pretty) and refers to the elytral colour pattern.
