= Hyperaspis delicata =

Scientific classification
- Kingdom: Animalia
- Phylum: Arthropoda
- Clade: Pancrustacea
- Class: Insecta
- Order: Coleoptera
- Suborder: Polyphaga
- Infraorder: Cucujiformia
- Family: Coccinellidae
- Genus: Hyperaspis
- Species: H. delicata

Binomial name
- Hyperaspis delicata Almeida & Vitorino, 1997

Species of beetle

Hyperaspis delicata is a species of beetle of the family Coccinellidae. It is found in southern Brazil.

== Description ==
Adults reach a length of about 2.56–3.20 mm. They have a black body and yellow head. The lateral one-fourth of the pronotum is yellow. The elytron has a small yellow subapical spot.
