= Hyperaspidius comparatus =

Scientific classification
- Kingdom: Animalia
- Phylum: Arthropoda
- Class: Insecta
- Order: Coleoptera
- Suborder: Polyphaga
- Infraorder: Cucujiformia
- Family: Coccinellidae
- Genus: Hyperaspidius
- Species: H. comparatus

Binomial name
- Hyperaspidius comparatus Casey, 1899

Synonyms
- Hyperaspidius juniperus Nunenmacher, 1944

Species of beetle

Hyperaspidius comparatus is a species of lady beetle in the family Coccinellidae. It is found in North America, where it has been recorded from California to south-western Texas, north to British Columbia.

== Description ==
Adults reach a length of about 1.40-2.10 mm. Males have a yellow pronotum, with indistinct yellowish brown spots in basal area. The pronotum of the females is yellowish brown with a yellow lateral margin. The elytron has two broad yellow vittae.
