= Diazonema hypocrita =

Scientific classification
- Kingdom: Animalia
- Phylum: Arthropoda
- Class: Insecta
- Order: Coleoptera
- Suborder: Polyphaga
- Infraorder: Cucujiformia
- Family: Coccinellidae
- Genus: Diazonema
- Species: D. hypocrita

Binomial name
- Diazonema hypocrita (Mulsant, 1850)

Synonyms
- Corystes hypocrita Mulsant, 1850

Species of beetle

Diazonema hypocrita is a species of beetle of the family Coccinellidae. It is found in northeastern and eastern South America.

== Description ==
Adults reach a length of about 4.0–5.3 mm. They have a yellow body. The pronotum has five reddish yellow spots. The elytron is pale red with a yellow border on the lateral and apical margins.
