= Tenuisvalvae bisquinquepustulata =

Scientific classification
- Kingdom: Animalia
- Phylum: Arthropoda
- Class: Insecta
- Order: Coleoptera
- Suborder: Polyphaga
- Infraorder: Cucujiformia
- Family: Coccinellidae
- Genus: Tenuisvalvae
- Species: T. bisquinquepustulata

Binomial name
- Tenuisvalvae bisquinquepustulata (Fabricius, 1801)

Synonyms
- Coccinella bisquinquepustulata Fabricius, 1801; Cleothera raynevalti Mulsant, 1853; Hyperaspis longicoxitis Nutting, 1980

Species of beetle

Tenuisvalvae bisquinquepustulata is a species of beetle of the family Coccinellidae. It is found in Central America, northern South America and some Caribbean islands. It has been introduced to the United States (southern California) and to central Africa.

== Description ==
Adults reach a length of about 2.7–3.2 mm. They have a black body and yellow head. The pronotum is yellow with a large black basomedian spot. The elytron has five yellow spots.
