= Mimoscymnus macula =

Scientific classification
- Kingdom: Animalia
- Phylum: Arthropoda
- Class: Insecta
- Order: Coleoptera
- Suborder: Polyphaga
- Infraorder: Cucujiformia
- Family: Coccinellidae
- Genus: Mimoscymnus
- Species: M. macula

Binomial name
- Mimoscymnus macula (Germain, 1854)

Synonyms
- Coccinella macula Germain, 1854; Coccinella nitida Philippi & Philippi, 1864; Coccinella vittata Philippi & Philippi, 1864; Pullus gilberti Brèthes, 1925; Mimoscymnus aquilerai Gordon, 1994

Species of beetle

Mimoscymnus macula is a species of beetle in the family Coccinellidae. It is found in central Chile.

== Description ==
Adults reach a length of about 2-2.2 mm. Adults are black, but the legs and anterior margin of the pronotum are reddish brown. The elytron has a large yellow area.
