= Thalassa glauca =

Scientific classification
- Kingdom: Animalia
- Phylum: Arthropoda
- Class: Insecta
- Order: Coleoptera
- Suborder: Polyphaga
- Infraorder: Cucujiformia
- Family: Coccinellidae
- Genus: Thalassa
- Species: T. glauca

Binomial name
- Thalassa glauca (Mulsant, 1850)

Synonyms
- Menoscelis glauca Mulsant, 1850

Species of beetle

Thalassa glauca is a species of beetle of the family Coccinellidae. It is found from Guatemala and Costa Rica south to Colombia and Brazil.
