= Selvadius maderi =

Scientific classification
- Kingdom: Animalia
- Phylum: Arthropoda
- Class: Insecta
- Order: Coleoptera
- Suborder: Polyphaga
- Infraorder: Cucujiformia
- Family: Coccinellidae
- Genus: Selvadius
- Species: S. maderi

Binomial name
- Selvadius maderi (Nunenmacher, 1937)

Synonyms
- Scymnus maderi Nunenmacher, 1937; Scymnus quercus Nunenmacher, 1934 (preocc.)

Species of beetle

Selvadius maderi is a species of beetle of the family Coccinellidae. It is found in North America, where it has been recorded from California.

== Description ==
Adults reach a length of about 1.20–1.40 mm.
