= Hinda (beetle) =

Scientific classification
- Kingdom: Animalia
- Phylum: Arthropoda
- Clade: Pancrustacea
- Class: Insecta
- Order: Coleoptera
- Suborder: Polyphaga
- Infraorder: Cucujiformia
- Family: Coccinellidae
- Subfamily: Coccinellinae
- Tribe: Brachiacanthini
- Genus: Hinda; Mulsant, 1850

Genus of beetles

Hinda is a genus of lady beetles in the family Coccinellidae.

== Species ==
- Hinda decas Weise, 1902
- Hinda decemverrucata (Mulsant, 1850)
- Hinda designata Mulsant, 1850
- Hinda ecuadorica Gordon & Canepari, 2013
