= Cleothera (beetle) =

Scientific classification
- Kingdom: Animalia
- Phylum: Arthropoda
- Clade: Pancrustacea
- Class: Insecta
- Order: Coleoptera
- Suborder: Polyphaga
- Infraorder: Cucujiformia
- Family: Coccinellidae
- Subfamily: Coccinellinae
- Tribe: Brachiacanthini
- Genus: Cleothera; Mulsant, 1850

Genus of beetles

Cleothera is a genus of lady beetles in the family Coccinellidae.

== Species ==
- Cleothera buqueti Mulsant, 1850
