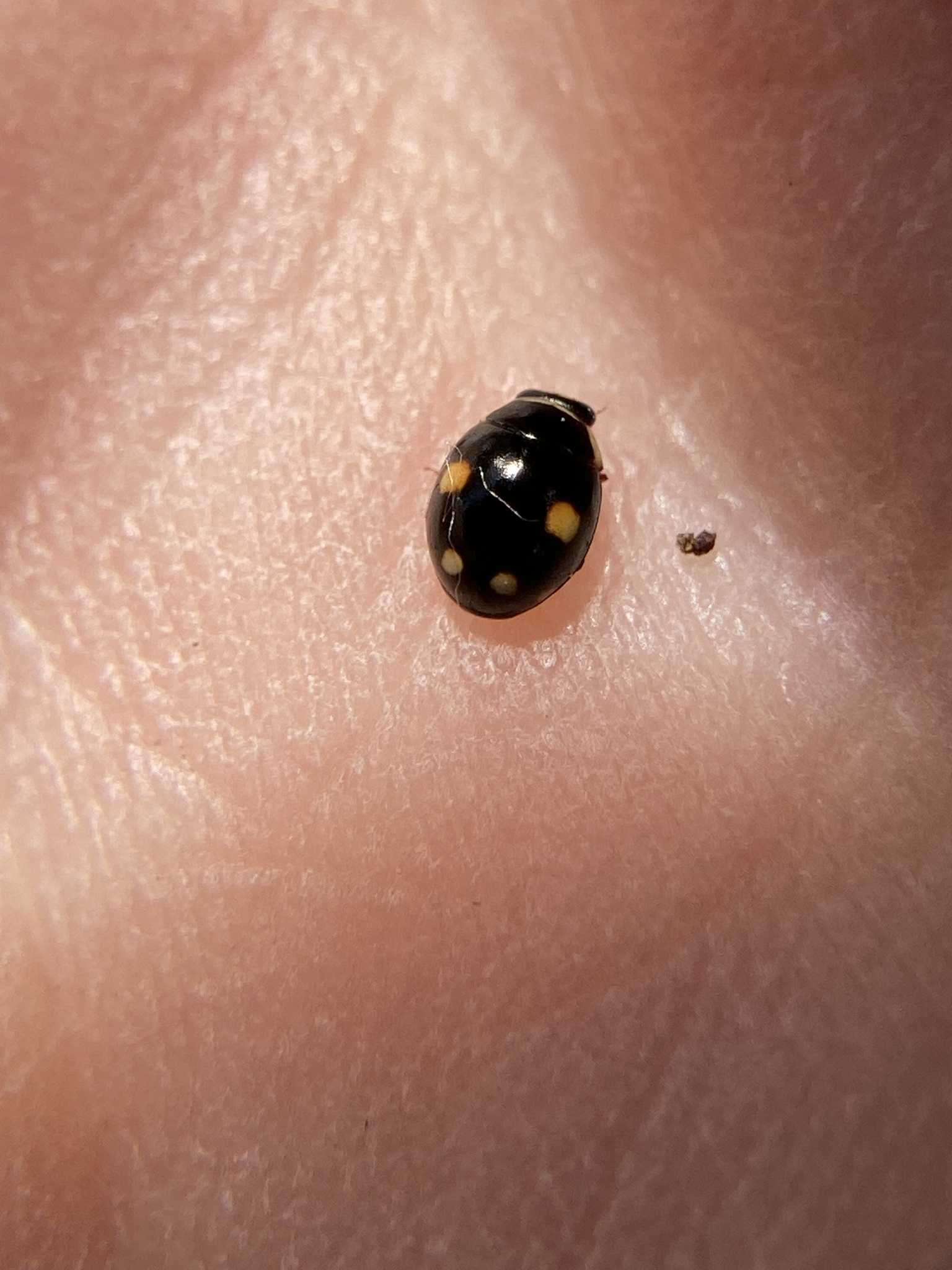

Scientific classification
- Kingdom: Animalia
- Phylum: Arthropoda
- Clade: Pancrustacea
- Class: Insecta
- Order: Coleoptera
- Suborder: Polyphaga
- Infraorder: Cucujiformia
- Family: Coccinellidae
- Genus: Hyperaspis
- Species: H. proba

Binomial name
- Hyperaspis proba (Say, 1826)

Synonyms
- Coccinella proba Say, 1827; Hyperaspis proba var. trinifer Casey, 1899

= Hyperaspis proba =

Species of beetle

Hyperaspis proba, the esteemed lady beetle, is a species of lady beetle in the family Coccinellidae. It is found in North America, where it has been recorded from Maine to South Carolina, west to South Dakota and western Texas.

== Description ==
Adults reach a length of about 2–3 mm. The pronotum of the males has a yellow anterior margin and lateral area, while the pronotum of the females has a black anterior margin and yellow lateral yellow area. The elytron has three yellow or red spots.
