= Tiphysa =

Scientific classification
- Kingdom: Animalia
- Phylum: Arthropoda
- Clade: Pancrustacea
- Class: Insecta
- Order: Coleoptera
- Suborder: Polyphaga
- Infraorder: Cucujiformia
- Family: Coccinellidae
- Subfamily: Coccinellinae
- Tribe: Brachiacanthini
- Genus: Tiphysa; Mulsant, 1850

Genus of beetles

Tiphysa is a genus of lady beetles in the family Coccinellidae.

== Species ==
- Tiphysa egae Crotch, 1874
- Tiphysa plumbea Mulsant, 1850
