= Helesius =

Scientific classification
- Kingdom: Animalia
- Phylum: Arthropoda
- Class: Insecta
- Order: Coleoptera
- Suborder: Polyphaga
- Infraorder: Cucujiformia
- Family: Coccinellidae
- Tribe: Hyperaspidini
- Genus: Helesius; Casey, 1899

Genus of beetles

Helesius is a genus of lady beetles in the family Coccinellidae. There are at least two described species in Helesius.

== Species ==
These two species belong to the genus Helesius:

- Helesius nigripennis (LeConte, 1878)
- Helesius nubilans Casey, 1899
