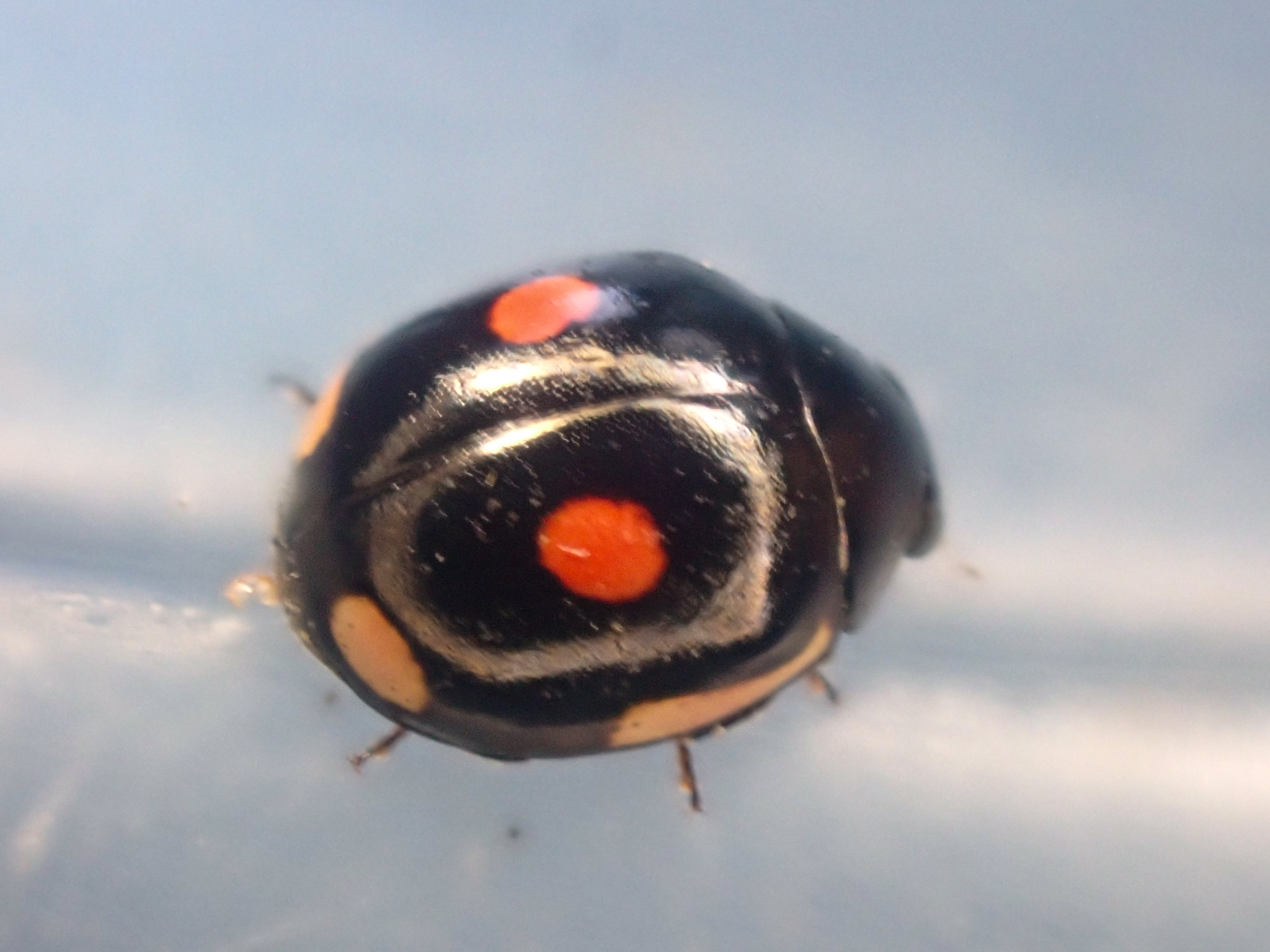

Scientific classification
- Kingdom: Animalia
- Phylum: Arthropoda
- Clade: Pancrustacea
- Class: Insecta
- Order: Coleoptera
- Suborder: Polyphaga
- Infraorder: Cucujiformia
- Family: Coccinellidae
- Genus: Hyperaspis
- Species: H. lateralis

Binomial name
- Hyperaspis lateralis Mulsant, 1850

Synonyms
- Hyperaspis laevipennis Casey, 1899; Hyperaspis montanica Casey, 1899; Hyperaspis wellmani Nunenmacher, 1911; Hyperaspis idae Nunenmacher, 1912; Hyperaspis lateralis nigrocauda Dobzhansky, 1941

= Hyperaspis lateralis =

Species of beetle

Hyperaspis lateralis, the lateral lady beetle, is a species of lady beetle in the family Coccinellidae. It is found in Central America and North America (Montana to New Mexico, west to British Columbia and southern California, as well as in Texas, Louisiana and Florida).

== Description ==
Adults reach a length of about 2.50-3.80 mm. The anterior margin and lateral area of the pronotum of the males is yellow, while the pronotum of the females is black. The elytron has a variable colour pattern.
