= Hyperaspidius oblongus =

Scientific classification
- Kingdom: Animalia
- Phylum: Arthropoda
- Class: Insecta
- Order: Coleoptera
- Suborder: Polyphaga
- Infraorder: Cucujiformia
- Family: Coccinellidae
- Genus: Hyperaspidius
- Species: H. oblongus

Binomial name
- Hyperaspidius oblongus Casey, 1908

Species of beetle

Hyperaspidius oblongus is a species of lady beetle in the family Coccinellidae. It is found in North America, where it has been recorded from Texas.

== Description ==
Adults reach a length of about 1.70-2.30 mm. The pronotum of the males is yellow with nebulous brown spots in the basal area, while the female pronotum is black with a yellow lateral margin. The elytron is black with a yellow vitta on anterior and lateral borders and an incomplete discal vitta.
