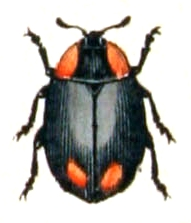
- Hyperaspis reppensis

Scientific classification
- Kingdom: Animalia
- Phylum: Arthropoda
- Class: Insecta
- Order: Coleoptera
- Suborder: Polyphaga
- Infraorder: Cucujiformia
- Family: Coccinellidae
- Subfamily: Coccinellinae
- Tribe: Hyperaspidini
- Genus: Hyperaspis; Chevrolat in Dejean, 1837

Diversity
- at least 100 species

Synonyms
- Aliana Duverger, 2002; Gordoni Duverger, 2002; Oxynychus Leconte, 1850; Cinachyra Gorham, 1899 (pre-occupied); Semra Özdikmen, 2007

= Hyperaspis (beetle) =

Genus of beetles

Hyperaspis is a genus of lady beetles in the family Coccinellidae. There are more than 100 described species in Hyperaspis.

== See also ==
- List of Hyperaspis species
