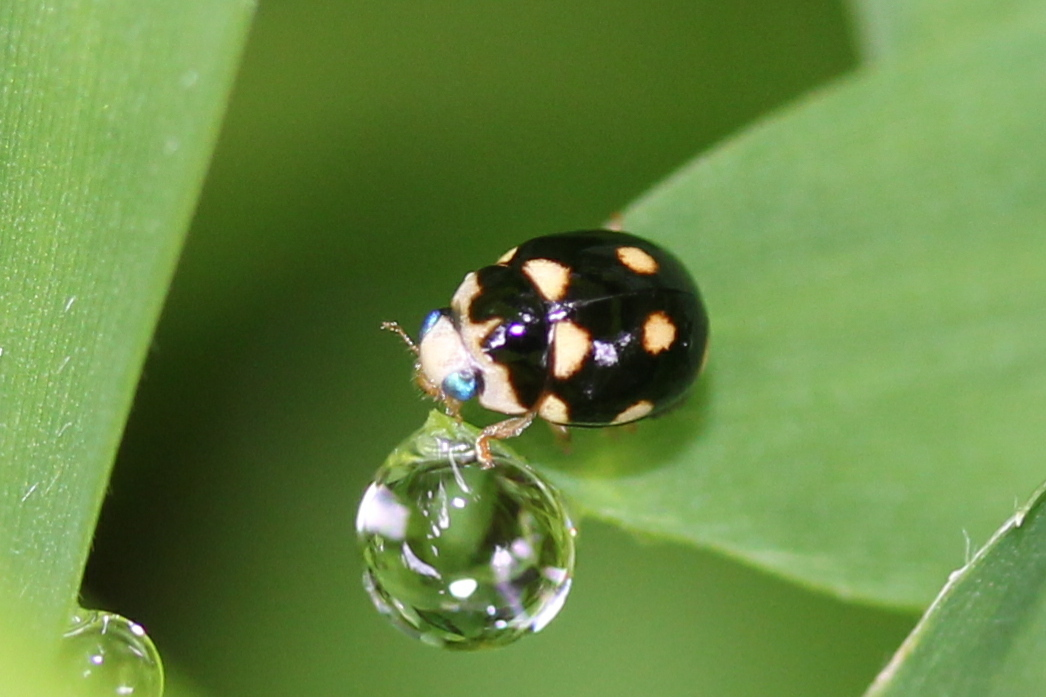

Scientific classification
- Kingdom: Animalia
- Phylum: Arthropoda
- Clade: Pancrustacea
- Class: Insecta
- Order: Coleoptera
- Suborder: Polyphaga
- Infraorder: Cucujiformia
- Family: Coccinellidae
- Genus: Brachiacantha
- Species: B. decempustulata

Binomial name
- Brachiacantha decempustulata (Melsheimer, 1847)

Synonyms
- Hyperaspis decempustulata Melsheimer, 1847; Brachiacantha ursina var. troglodytes Mulsant, 1850; Brachiacantha stellata Casey, 1899

= Brachiacantha decempustulata =

Species of beetle

Brachiacantha decempustulata, the ten-spotted spurleg, is a species of lady beetle in the family Coccinellidae. It is found in North America, where it has been recorded from New Brunswick and Nova Scotia to Florida, west to Wisconsin and Louisiana. It is also found in North Dakota.

== Description ==
Adults reach a length of about 2-2.5 mm. Adults are similar to Brachiacantha felina, but the form of their body is oval and the spots on the elytron are smaller.
