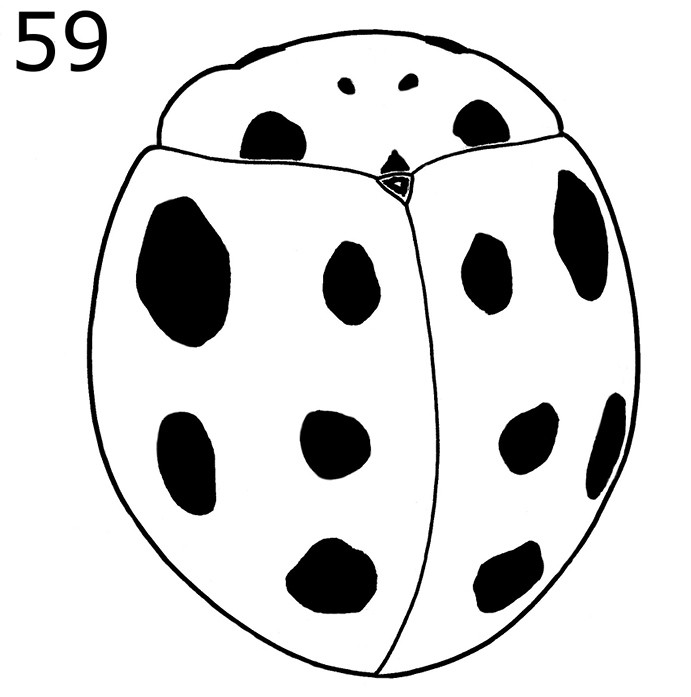

Scientific classification
- Kingdom: Animalia
- Phylum: Arthropoda
- Clade: Pancrustacea
- Class: Insecta
- Order: Coleoptera
- Suborder: Polyphaga
- Infraorder: Cucujiformia
- Family: Coccinellidae
- Genus: Brachiacantha
- Species: B. invertita

Binomial name
- Brachiacantha invertita Nestor-Arriola, Toledo-Hernández, Solís, González & Větrovec, 2021

= Brachiacantha invertita =

Species of beetle

Brachiacantha invertita is a species of beetle of the family Coccinellidae. It is found in Costa Rica.

== Description ==
Adults reach a length of about 2.9–3.1 mm (0.11–0.12 in). The dorsal colour is yellow with black spots. The male abdomen has several ventrites depressed and emarginate.

== Etymology ==
The species name is derived from Latin inversos (meaning invert) and refers to the dorsal colour pattern, yellow with five black spots, the inverse of that of many Brachiacantha species (black with five yellow spots).
