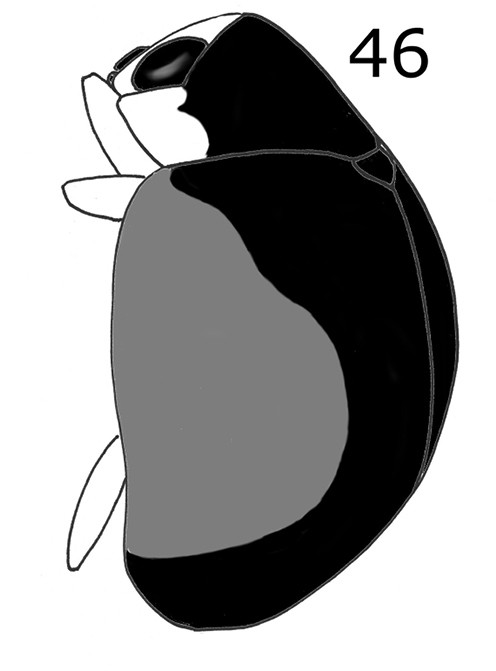

Scientific classification
- Kingdom: Animalia
- Phylum: Arthropoda
- Clade: Pancrustacea
- Class: Insecta
- Order: Coleoptera
- Suborder: Polyphaga
- Infraorder: Cucujiformia
- Family: Coccinellidae
- Genus: Brachiacantha
- Species: B. aurantiapleura

Binomial name
- Brachiacantha aurantiapleura Nestor-Arriola, Toledo-Hernández and Solís, 2021

= Brachiacantha aurantiapleura =

Species of beetle

Brachiacantha aurantiapleura is a species of beetle of the family Coccinellidae. It is found in Costa Rica.

== Description ==
Adults reach a length of about 2.4–2.5 mm (0.094–0.098 in). The dorsal colour is black with the head and the angles of the pronotum yellow in males. Both sexes have a large lateral orange macula on each elytron. The dorsal surface has a slightly golden sheen.

== Etymology ==
The species name is derived from Latin aurantius (meaning orange) and pleurón (meaning sides) and refers to the dorsal colour pattern.
