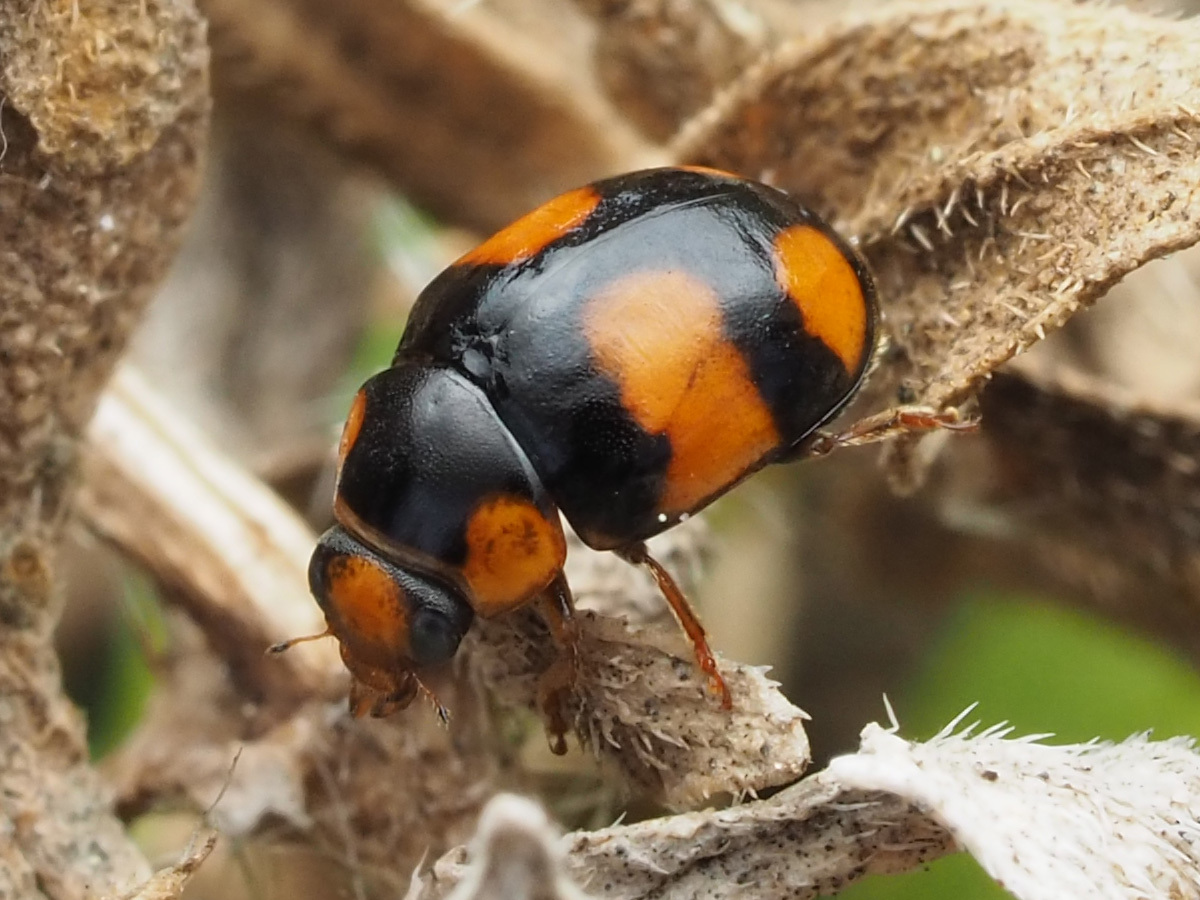

Scientific classification
- Kingdom: Animalia
- Phylum: Arthropoda
- Clade: Pancrustacea
- Class: Insecta
- Order: Coleoptera
- Suborder: Polyphaga
- Infraorder: Cucujiformia
- Family: Coccinellidae
- Genus: Brachiacantha
- Species: B. dentipes

Binomial name
- Brachiacantha dentipes (Fabricius, 1801)

Synonyms
- Coccinella dentipes Fabricius, 1801; Brachiacantha socialis Casey, 1899

= Brachiacantha dentipes =

Species of beetle

Brachiacantha dentipes is a species of lady beetle in the family Coccinellidae. It is found in North America, where it has been recorded from New England and Ontario to Florida, west to Colorado and New Mexico. In the south, its range extends to Costa Rica and it is also found on the Bahamas.

== Description ==
Adults reach a length of about 4.75-6.30 mm. The pronotum of the males is black with the anterior margin and lateral area yellow or orange. The pronotum of the females is similar, but the anterior margin is black. The elytron is black with an orange or yellow apical spot and a median band.
