= Brachiacantha rotunda =

Scientific classification
- Kingdom: Animalia
- Phylum: Arthropoda
- Clade: Pancrustacea
- Class: Insecta
- Order: Coleoptera
- Suborder: Polyphaga
- Infraorder: Cucujiformia
- Family: Coccinellidae
- Genus: Brachiacantha
- Species: B. rotunda

Binomial name
- Brachiacantha rotunda Gordon, 1985

Species of beetle

Brachiacantha rotunda is a species of beetle of the family Coccinellidae. It is found in North America, where it has been recorded from Virginia, Ontario, Quebec, Washington D.C., Kentucky, Missouri, New Jersey, New York, Ohio and Pennsylvania.

== Description ==
Adults reach a length of about 3.10-4.00 mm. The pronotum is black with a yellow anterior margin and apical angle. The elytron is black with five yellow spots.

== Etymology ==
This species name refers to the round body form.
