= Brachiacantha monica =

Scientific classification
- Kingdom: Animalia
- Phylum: Arthropoda
- Clade: Pancrustacea
- Class: Insecta
- Order: Coleoptera
- Suborder: Polyphaga
- Infraorder: Cucujiformia
- Family: Coccinellidae
- Genus: Brachiacantha
- Species: B. monica

Binomial name
- Brachiacantha monica Gordon & Canepari, 2014

Species of beetle

Brachiacantha monica is a species of beetle of the family Coccinellidae. It is found in Bolivia.

== Description ==
Adults reach a length of about 2.4 mm. They have a black body and yellow head. The pronotum is black, except for the apical margin and anterolateral angle, which are yellow. The elytron has two reddish yellow spots.
