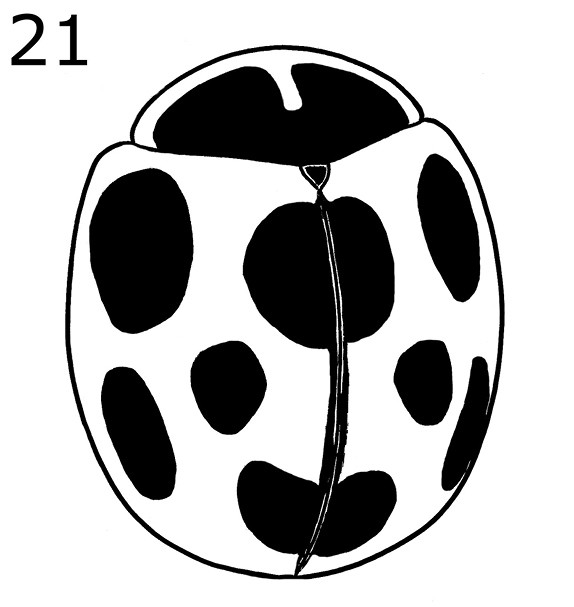

Scientific classification
- Kingdom: Animalia
- Phylum: Arthropoda
- Clade: Pancrustacea
- Class: Insecta
- Order: Coleoptera
- Suborder: Polyphaga
- Infraorder: Cucujiformia
- Family: Coccinellidae
- Genus: Brachiacantha
- Species: B. nubes

Binomial name
- Brachiacantha nubes Nestor-Arriola, Toledo-Hernández, Solís, González & Větrovec, 2021

= Brachiacantha nubes =

Species of beetle

Brachiacantha nubes is a species of beetle of the family Coccinellidae. It is found in Costa Rica.

== Description ==
Adults reach a length of about 2.4 mm (0.094 in). The dorsal colour is pale orange with five black spots on each elytron, while the pronotum is orange with a basal black macula covering more than the half of the pronotum.

== Etymology ==
The name refers to the type location, the Las Nubes Biological Reserve Ecocampus.
