= Brachiacantha erythrura =

Scientific classification
- Kingdom: Animalia
- Phylum: Arthropoda
- Clade: Pancrustacea
- Class: Insecta
- Order: Coleoptera
- Suborder: Polyphaga
- Infraorder: Cucujiformia
- Family: Coccinellidae
- Genus: Brachiacantha
- Species: B. erythrura

Binomial name
- Brachiacantha erythrura (Mulsant, 1850)

Synonyms
- Brachyacantha erythrura Mulsant, 1850

Species of beetle

Brachiacantha erythrura is a species of beetle of the family Coccinellidae. It is found in Mexico and Central America.

== Description ==
Adults reach a length of about 3.8–3.9 mm (0.15–0.15 in). They are dorsally black, with the head and posterior margin of the elytra red, orange or yellow. The ventral surface is light brown to orange. The third ventrite of the male has small cusps.
