= Brachiacantha argentinica =

Scientific classification
- Kingdom: Animalia
- Phylum: Arthropoda
- Clade: Pancrustacea
- Class: Insecta
- Order: Coleoptera
- Suborder: Polyphaga
- Infraorder: Cucujiformia
- Family: Coccinellidae
- Genus: Brachiacantha
- Species: B. argentinica

Binomial name
- Brachiacantha argentinica (Weise, 1922)

Synonyms
- Hyperaspis argentinica Weise, 1922

Species of beetle

Brachiacantha argentinica is a species of beetle of the family Coccinellidae. It is found in Argentina and Uruguay.

== Description ==
Adults reach a length of about 3.4–3.7 mm. They have a black body, the head with a dark reddish brown area. The pronotum has a yellow anterolateral angle and lateral margin. The elytron is reddish yellow with irregular black vitta, one elongate black spot and one black spot on the lateral margin.
