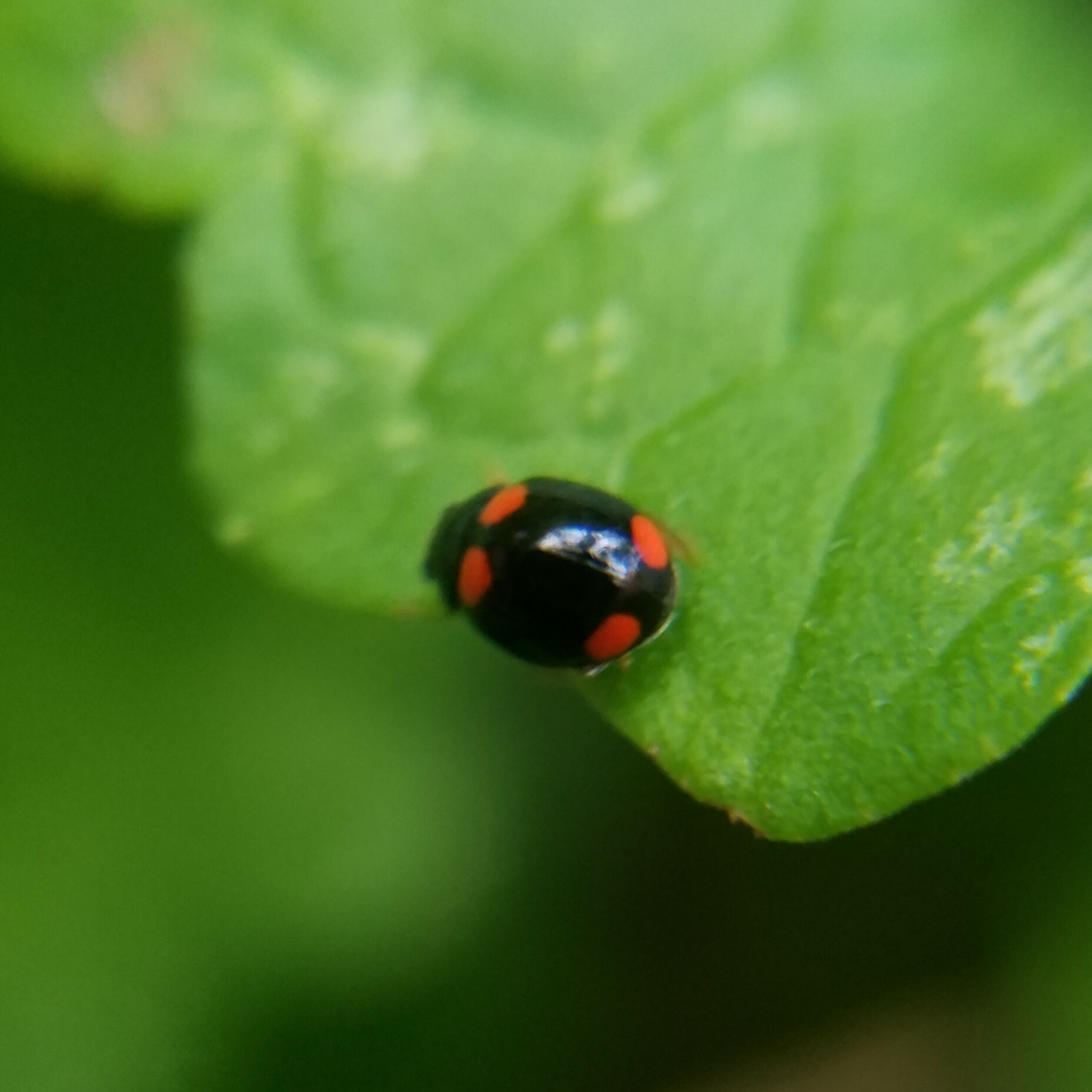

Scientific classification
- Kingdom: Animalia
- Phylum: Arthropoda
- Clade: Pancrustacea
- Class: Insecta
- Order: Coleoptera
- Suborder: Polyphaga
- Infraorder: Cucujiformia
- Family: Coccinellidae
- Genus: Brachiacantha
- Species: B. quadripunctata

Binomial name
- Brachiacantha quadripunctata Melsheimer, 1847

Synonyms
- Brachiacantha 4-punctata Melsheimer, 1847; Brachiacantha basalis Melsheimer, 1847; Brachiacantha confusa Mulsant, 1850; Brachiacantha diversa Mulsant, 1850; Brachyacantha flavifrons Mulsant, 1850; Hyperaspis carolina Casey, 1924

= Brachiacantha quadripunctata =

Species of beetle

Brachiacantha quadripunctata is a species of lady beetle in the family Coccinellidae. It is found in North America.

== Description ==
Adults reach a length of about 2.50-4.0 mm. Males have a yellow head, while the head of the females is black. The pronotum is black with a yellow apical margin and anterolateral angle. The elytron is black with a basal and apical spot in females. Males have an additional humeral spot. Subspecies flavifrons is similar, but the elytron has an additional marginal spot.

== Subspecies ==
These two subspecies belong to the species Brachiacantha quadripunctata:

- Brachiacantha quadripunctata quadripunctata (Massachusetts and New York to Virginia and Tennessee, west to Iowa and Kansas)
- Brachiacantha quadripunctata flavifrons Mulsant, 1850 (Alabama, Florida, Georgia, North Carolina, South Carolina)
