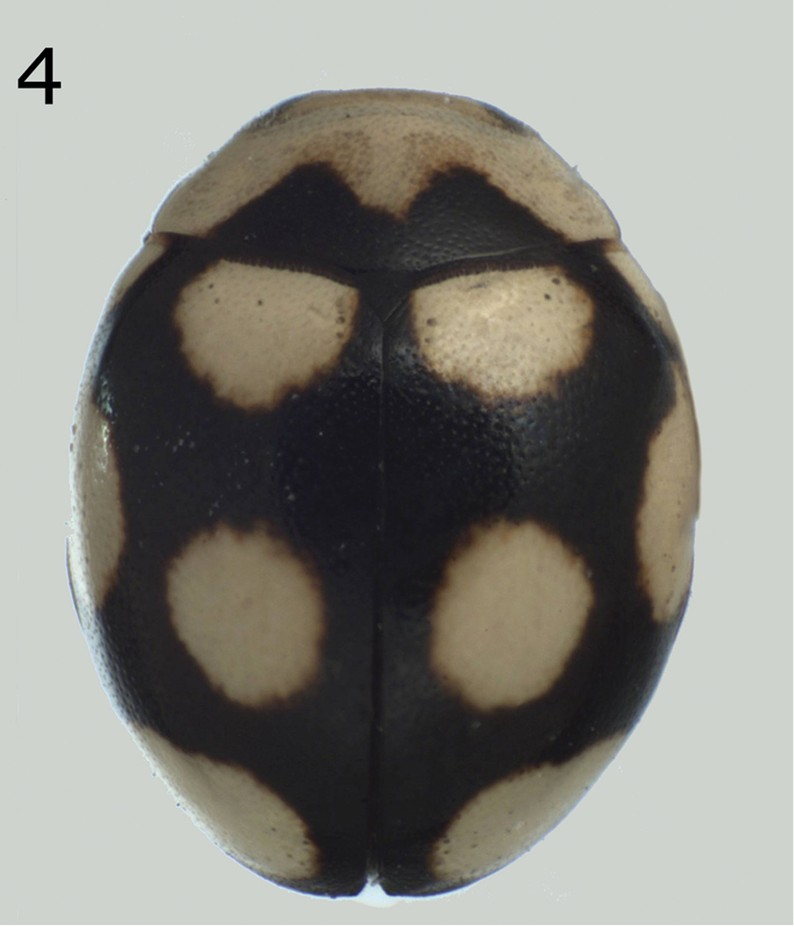

Scientific classification
- Kingdom: Animalia
- Phylum: Arthropoda
- Clade: Pancrustacea
- Class: Insecta
- Order: Coleoptera
- Suborder: Polyphaga
- Infraorder: Cucujiformia
- Family: Coccinellidae
- Genus: Brachiacantha
- Species: B. octostigma

Binomial name
- Brachiacantha octostigma Mulsant, 1850

Synonyms
- Brachyacantha octostigma

= Brachiacantha octostigma =

Species of beetle

Brachiacantha octostigma is a species of beetle of the family Coccinellidae. It is found in Mexico and Central America (including Guatemala and Panama).

== Description ==
They have an oval body. The elytra are black, each elytron with five yellow spots. The male abdomen has several ventrites emarginated and depressed.
