= Brachiacantha jill =

Scientific classification
- Kingdom: Animalia
- Phylum: Arthropoda
- Clade: Pancrustacea
- Class: Insecta
- Order: Coleoptera
- Suborder: Polyphaga
- Infraorder: Cucujiformia
- Family: Coccinellidae
- Genus: Brachiacantha
- Species: B. jill

Binomial name
- Brachiacantha jill Gordon & Canepari, 2014

Species of beetle

Brachiacantha jill is a species of beetle of the Coccinellidae family. It is found in Argentina.

== Description ==
Adults reach a length of about 2-2.7 mm. They have a yellow body and black head. The pronotum has a large black marking and the lateral one-fifth is yellow. The elytron is reddish yellow with black margins and three black spots.
