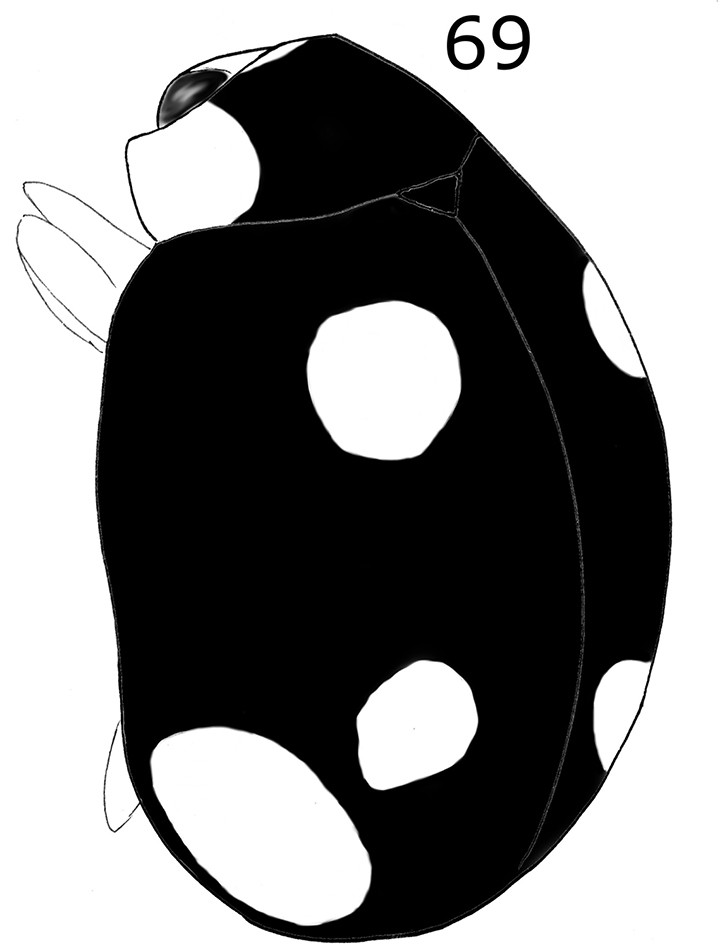

Scientific classification
- Kingdom: Animalia
- Phylum: Arthropoda
- Clade: Pancrustacea
- Class: Insecta
- Order: Coleoptera
- Suborder: Polyphaga
- Infraorder: Cucujiformia
- Family: Coccinellidae
- Genus: Brachiacantha
- Species: B. tica

Binomial name
- Brachiacantha tica Nestor-Arriola, Toledo-Hernández, Solís, González & Větrovec, 2021

= Brachiacantha tica =

Species of beetle

Brachiacantha tica is a species of beetle of the family Coccinellidae. It is found in Costa Rica.

== Description ==
Adults reach a length of about 2.1–2.6 mm (0.083–0.102 in). The dorsal colour is black, with the anterior angles of the pronotum pale yellow. Each elytron has three pale yellow spots, one near the scutellar shield and two near the apex.

== Etymology ==
The species name is a popular name for the inhabitants of Costa Rica.
