= Brachiacantha distincta =

Scientific classification
- Kingdom: Animalia
- Phylum: Arthropoda
- Clade: Pancrustacea
- Class: Insecta
- Order: Coleoptera
- Suborder: Polyphaga
- Infraorder: Cucujiformia
- Family: Coccinellidae
- Genus: Brachiacantha
- Species: B. distincta

Binomial name
- Brachiacantha distincta Nunenmacher, 1948

Species of beetle

Brachiacantha distincta is a species of beetle of the family Coccinellidae. It is found in Brazil (Mato Grosso).

== Description ==
Adults reach a length of about 4 mm (0.16 in). The head is black. The body is also black, but has yellow sides. The elytra are black with a large oblong-shaped spot on the anterior half, as well as a yellow apical spot yellow. The ventral surface and legs are mostly rufescent.
