= Brachiacantha eva =

Scientific classification
- Kingdom: Animalia
- Phylum: Arthropoda
- Clade: Pancrustacea
- Class: Insecta
- Order: Coleoptera
- Suborder: Polyphaga
- Infraorder: Cucujiformia
- Family: Coccinellidae
- Genus: Brachiacantha
- Species: B. eva

Binomial name
- Brachiacantha eva Gordon & Canepari, 2014

Species of beetle

Brachiacantha eva is a species of beetle of the family Coccinellidae. It is found in Argentina.

== Description ==
Adults reach a length of about 2.9 mm. They have a yellow body. The pronotum has a black marking. The elytron is black with the median vitta, lateral margin and apical spot yellow.
