= Brachiacantha mexicana =

Scientific classification
- Kingdom: Animalia
- Phylum: Arthropoda
- Clade: Pancrustacea
- Class: Insecta
- Order: Coleoptera
- Suborder: Polyphaga
- Infraorder: Cucujiformia
- Family: Coccinellidae
- Genus: Brachiacantha
- Species: B. mexicana

Binomial name
- Brachiacantha mexicana Leng, 1911

Synonyms
- Brachyacantha mexicana

Species of beetle

Brachiacantha mexicana is a species of beetle of the family Coccinellidae. It is found in Mexico (Durango, Hidalgo, México City, Mexico State, Michoacán, Oaxaca, Puebla, Tlaxcala).
