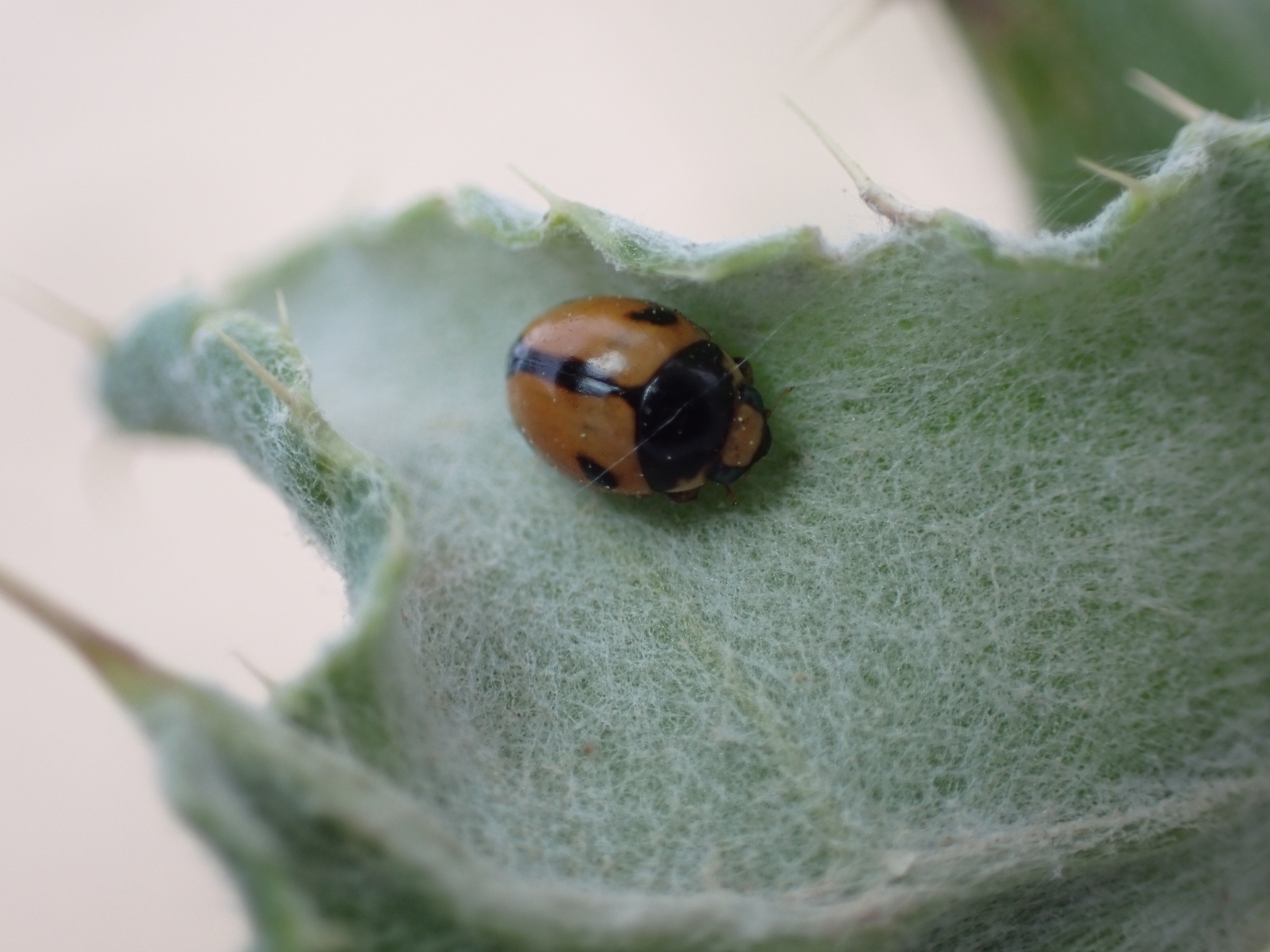

Scientific classification
- Kingdom: Animalia
- Phylum: Arthropoda
- Clade: Pancrustacea
- Class: Insecta
- Order: Coleoptera
- Suborder: Polyphaga
- Infraorder: Cucujiformia
- Family: Coccinellidae
- Genus: Brachiacantha
- Species: B. albifrons

Binomial name
- Brachiacantha albifrons (Say, 1824)

Synonyms
- Coccinella albifrons Say, 1824; Brachiacantha pacifica Casey, 1899

= Brachiacantha albifrons =

Species of beetle

Brachiacantha albifrons, known generally as the white-fronted lady beetle or pale anthill ladybug, is a species of lady beetle in the family Coccinellidae. It is found in North America. where it has been recorded from Alberta, Manitoba, Saskatchewan, Colorado, Nebraska, California, Missouri and North Dakota.

== Description ==
Adults reach a length of about 3.50-4.40 mm. They have a yellow head. The pronotum is black with the anterior one-third yellow. The elytron is yellow with two spots brown.
