= Brachiacantha buckleyi =

Scientific classification
- Kingdom: Animalia
- Phylum: Arthropoda
- Clade: Pancrustacea
- Class: Insecta
- Order: Coleoptera
- Suborder: Polyphaga
- Infraorder: Cucujiformia
- Family: Coccinellidae
- Genus: Brachiacantha
- Species: B. buckleyi

Binomial name
- Brachiacantha buckleyi Crotch, 1874

Species of beetle

Brachiacantha buckleyi is a species of beetle of the family Coccinellidae. It is found in Ecuador, French Guiana and Peru.

== Description ==
Adults reach a length of about 3.0–3.4 mm. They have a yellow body. The elytron has a large round black spot.
