= Brachiacantha testudo =

Scientific classification
- Kingdom: Animalia
- Phylum: Arthropoda
- Clade: Pancrustacea
- Class: Insecta
- Order: Coleoptera
- Suborder: Polyphaga
- Infraorder: Cucujiformia
- Family: Coccinellidae
- Genus: Brachiacantha
- Species: B. testudo

Binomial name
- Brachiacantha testudo Casey, 1899

Species of beetle

Brachiacantha testudo, the turtle lady, is a species of lady beetle in the family Coccinellidae. It is found in North America, where it has been recorded from Texas.

== Description ==
Adults reach a length of about 2.25-3.30 mm. The pronotum is black with a yellow apical margin and anterolateral angle. The elytron is black or brown with five yellow spots.
