= Brachiacantha octopustulata =

Scientific classification
- Kingdom: Animalia
- Phylum: Arthropoda
- Clade: Pancrustacea
- Class: Insecta
- Order: Coleoptera
- Suborder: Polyphaga
- Infraorder: Cucujiformia
- Family: Coccinellidae
- Genus: Brachiacantha
- Species: B. octopustulata

Binomial name
- Brachiacantha octopustulata (Fabricius, 1801)

Synonyms
- Coccinella octopustulata Fabricius, 1801

Species of beetle

Brachiacantha octopustulata is a species of beetle of the family Coccinellidae. It is found in Brazil, Bolivia, French Guiana, Guyana, Peru, Surinam and Venezuela.

== Description ==
Adults reach a length of about 2.3–3.6 mm. They have a yellow body. The pronotum has a large black marking. The elytron is black with four large round yellow spots.
