= Brachiacantha lauren =

Scientific classification
- Kingdom: Animalia
- Phylum: Arthropoda
- Clade: Pancrustacea
- Class: Insecta
- Order: Coleoptera
- Suborder: Polyphaga
- Infraorder: Cucujiformia
- Family: Coccinellidae
- Genus: Brachiacantha
- Species: B. lauren

Binomial name
- Brachiacantha lauren Gordon & Canepari, 2014

Species of beetle

Brachiacantha lauren is a species of beetle of the family Coccinellidae. It is found in Paraguay.

== Description ==
Adults reach a length of about 2.6 mm. They have a dark brown body, but the lateral one-fourth of the pronotum is yellow. The elytron is yellow with a dark brown border and a dark brown band.
