= Brachiacantha bruchi =

Scientific classification
- Kingdom: Animalia
- Phylum: Arthropoda
- Clade: Pancrustacea
- Class: Insecta
- Order: Coleoptera
- Suborder: Polyphaga
- Infraorder: Cucujiformia
- Family: Coccinellidae
- Genus: Brachiacantha
- Species: B. bruchi

Binomial name
- Brachiacantha bruchi Weise, 1904

Species of beetle

Brachiacantha bruchi is a species of beetle of the family Coccinellidae. It is found in Argentina, Brazil, Paraguay and Peru.

== Description ==
Adults reach a length of about 3–4 mm. They have a yellow body. The pronotum has a black marking. The elytron has a black border and three large black spots.
