= Brachiacantha brevicuspidata =

Scientific classification
- Kingdom: Animalia
- Phylum: Arthropoda
- Clade: Pancrustacea
- Class: Insecta
- Order: Coleoptera
- Suborder: Polyphaga
- Infraorder: Cucujiformia
- Family: Coccinellidae
- Genus: Brachiacantha
- Species: B. brevicuspidata

Binomial name
- Brachiacantha brevicuspidata Nestor-Arriola & Toledo-Hernández, 2017

Species of beetle

Brachiacantha brevicuspidata is a species of beetle of the family Coccinellidae. It is found in Mexico (Morelos, Veracruz).

== Description ==
Adults reach a length of about 3.5–3.6 mm (0.14–0.14 in). The dorsal colour is black with a pale yellow head. The anterolateral angles and anterior border of the pronotum are pale yellow. Each elytron has four orange spots. The ventral surface is mostly black, but the antennae are yellow with the two apical articles dark brown. The legs are also yellow.

== Etymology ==
The species name is derived from Latin brevis (meaning short), cuspis (meaning spear head) and ata (meaning possessing) and refers to the really small cusps on the male abdomen.
