= Brachiacantha egae =

Scientific classification
- Kingdom: Animalia
- Phylum: Arthropoda
- Clade: Pancrustacea
- Class: Insecta
- Order: Coleoptera
- Suborder: Polyphaga
- Infraorder: Cucujiformia
- Family: Coccinellidae
- Genus: Brachiacantha
- Species: B. egae

Binomial name
- Brachiacantha egae (Crotch, 1874)

Synonyms
- Hyperaspis egae Crotch, 1874

Species of beetle

Brachiacantha egae is a species of beetle of the family Coccinellidae. It is found in Brazil.

== Description ==
Adults reach a length of about 2.8 mm. They have a brown body and a yellow head. The pronotum is dark brown, while the lateral one-fifth is yellow. There is also a yellow marking. The elytron has one large oval yellow spot and two small indistinct spots.
