= Brachiacantha quadrillum =

Scientific classification
- Kingdom: Animalia
- Phylum: Arthropoda
- Clade: Pancrustacea
- Class: Insecta
- Order: Coleoptera
- Suborder: Polyphaga
- Infraorder: Cucujiformia
- Family: Coccinellidae
- Genus: Brachiacantha
- Species: B. quadrillum

Binomial name
- Brachiacantha quadrillum LeConte, 1858

Species of beetle

Brachiacantha quadrillum is a species of lady beetle in the family Coccinellidae. It is found in North America, where it has been recorded from Texas.

== Description ==
Adults reach a length of about 3.80-4.75 mm. The pronotum is black with a large reddish yellow lateral area. The elytron is black with reddish yellow spots.
