= Brachiacantha blaisdelli =

Scientific classification
- Kingdom: Animalia
- Phylum: Arthropoda
- Clade: Pancrustacea
- Class: Insecta
- Order: Coleoptera
- Suborder: Polyphaga
- Infraorder: Cucujiformia
- Family: Coccinellidae
- Genus: Brachiacantha
- Species: B. blaisdelli

Binomial name
- Brachiacantha blaisdelli Nunenmacher, 1909

Species of beetle

Brachiacantha blaisdelli is a species of beetle in the family Coccinellidae. It is found in North America, where it has been recorded from California and Nevada.

== Description ==
Adults reach a length of about 4.4–5 mm. The pronotum of the males is black with a yellow anterior margin and a large reddish yellow lateral area. The pronotum of the females is black with a large orange lateral area. The elytron is black with orange spots.
