= Brachiacantha illustris =

Scientific classification
- Kingdom: Animalia
- Phylum: Arthropoda
- Clade: Pancrustacea
- Class: Insecta
- Order: Coleoptera
- Suborder: Polyphaga
- Infraorder: Cucujiformia
- Family: Coccinellidae
- Genus: Brachiacantha
- Species: B. illustris

Binomial name
- Brachiacantha illustris Casey, 1899

Species of beetle

Brachiacantha illustris is a species in the family Coccinellidae ("lady beetles"), in the order Coleoptera ("beetles"). Brachiacantha illustris is found in North America, where it has been recorded from Colorado, Idaho, Montana and Wyoming.

== Description ==
Adults reach a length of about 3.40-4.60 mm. The pronotum is black a yellow anterior margin and anterolateral angle broadly yellow. The elytron has a variable colour pattern.
