= Brachiacantha soltaui =

Scientific classification
- Kingdom: Animalia
- Phylum: Arthropoda
- Clade: Pancrustacea
- Class: Insecta
- Order: Coleoptera
- Suborder: Polyphaga
- Infraorder: Cucujiformia
- Family: Coccinellidae
- Genus: Brachiacantha
- Species: B. soltaui

Binomial name
- Brachiacantha soltaui Gordon, 1985

Species of beetle

Brachiacantha soltaui is a species of beetle in the family Coccinellidae. It is found in North America, where it has been recorded from the US state of Mississippi.

== Description ==
Adults reach a length of about 5 mm (males) and 5.3 mm (females). The head and pronotum are yellow, but the pronotum has a small basal brown area. The elytron is black with an orange humeral angle and apical spot.

== Etymology ==
The species is named for H. Soltau, the collector.
