= Brachiacantha cathy =

Scientific classification
- Kingdom: Animalia
- Phylum: Arthropoda
- Clade: Pancrustacea
- Class: Insecta
- Order: Coleoptera
- Suborder: Polyphaga
- Infraorder: Cucujiformia
- Family: Coccinellidae
- Genus: Brachiacantha
- Species: B. cathy

Binomial name
- Brachiacantha cathy Gordon & Canepari, 2014

Species of beetle

Brachiacantha cathy is a species of beetle of the family Coccinellidae. It is found in Venezuela.

== Description ==
Adults reach a length of about 2.6 mm. They have a dark brown body, but the lateral one-fourth of the pronotum is yellow. The elytron is yellow with a black border and one humeral spot and one apical spot.
