= Brachiacantha barberi =

Scientific classification
- Kingdom: Animalia
- Phylum: Arthropoda
- Clade: Pancrustacea
- Class: Insecta
- Order: Coleoptera
- Suborder: Polyphaga
- Infraorder: Cucujiformia
- Family: Coccinellidae
- Genus: Brachiacantha
- Species: B. barberi

Binomial name
- Brachiacantha barberi Gordon, 1985

Species of beetle

Brachiacantha barberi, or Barber's lady beetle, is a species of lady beetle in the family Coccinellidae. It is found from south-eastern North America (where it has been recorded from Texas) to Costa Rica.

== Description ==
Adults reach a length of about 3.30 mm (males) and 3.10 mm (females). They have a yellow head. The pronotum is black with a reddish yellow anterior border and lateral area. The elytron is black with a yellow apical spot, median band and humeral spot.

== Etymology ==
This species is named for H. S. Barber.
