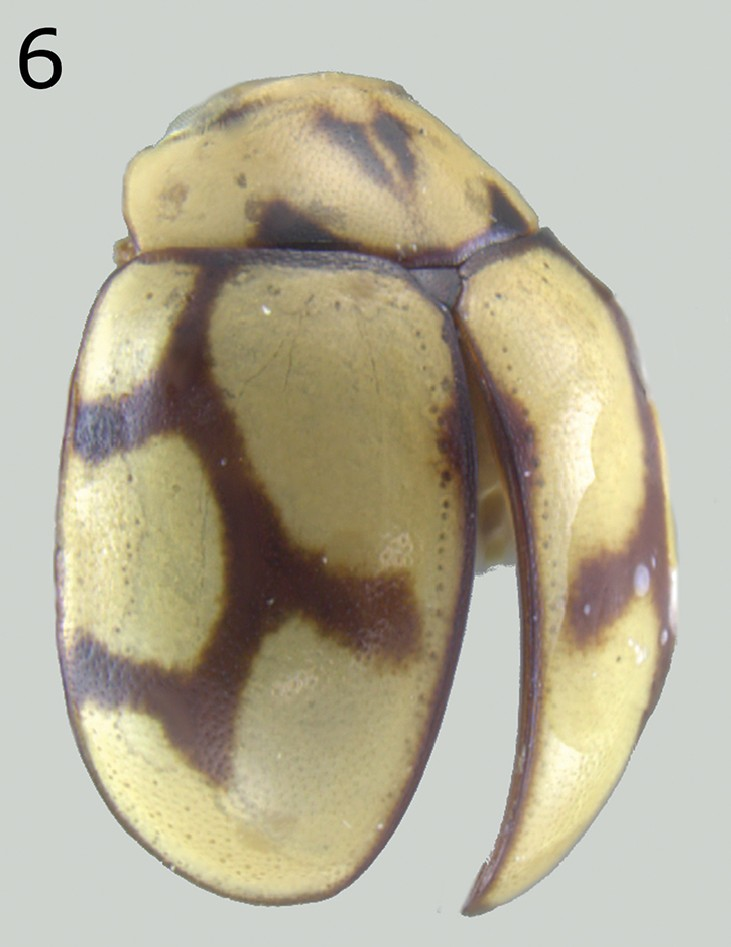

Scientific classification
- Kingdom: Animalia
- Phylum: Arthropoda
- Clade: Pancrustacea
- Class: Insecta
- Order: Coleoptera
- Suborder: Polyphaga
- Infraorder: Cucujiformia
- Family: Coccinellidae
- Genus: Brachiacantha
- Species: B. aperta

Binomial name
- Brachiacantha aperta Weise, 1903

Synonyms
- Brachyacantha aperta

= Brachiacantha aperta =

Species of beetle

Brachiacantha aperta is a species of beetle of the family Coccinellidae. It is found in Costa Rica.

== Description ==
They are pale yellow or yellowish white. The pronotum has three or four brown spots and each elytron has a brown-colored branched line pattern.
