= Brachiacantha sellata =

Scientific classification
- Kingdom: Animalia
- Phylum: Arthropoda
- Clade: Pancrustacea
- Class: Insecta
- Order: Coleoptera
- Suborder: Polyphaga
- Infraorder: Cucujiformia
- Family: Coccinellidae
- Genus: Brachiacantha
- Species: B. sellata

Binomial name
- Brachiacantha sellata Mulsant, 1850

Species of beetle

Brachiacantha sellata is a species of beetle of the family Coccinellidae. It is found in Brazil.

== Description ==
Adults reach a length of about 4.2–5.0 mm. They have a yellow body. The pronotum has a black marking. The elytron has a black border and three large black spots.
