= Brachiacantha truncata =

Scientific classification
- Kingdom: Animalia
- Phylum: Arthropoda
- Clade: Pancrustacea
- Class: Insecta
- Order: Coleoptera
- Suborder: Polyphaga
- Infraorder: Cucujiformia
- Family: Coccinellidae
- Genus: Brachiacantha
- Species: B. truncata

Binomial name
- Brachiacantha truncata Nestor-Arriola & Toledo-Hernández, 2017

Species of beetle

Brachiacantha truncata is a species of beetle of the family Coccinellidae. It is found in Honduras and Mexico.

== Description ==
Adults reach a length of about 3.2–5.3 mm (0.13–0.21 in). Males have four spots on the elytron, while females have three. The males have a triangular, dull apex, and a cusp at each side of the middle line.
