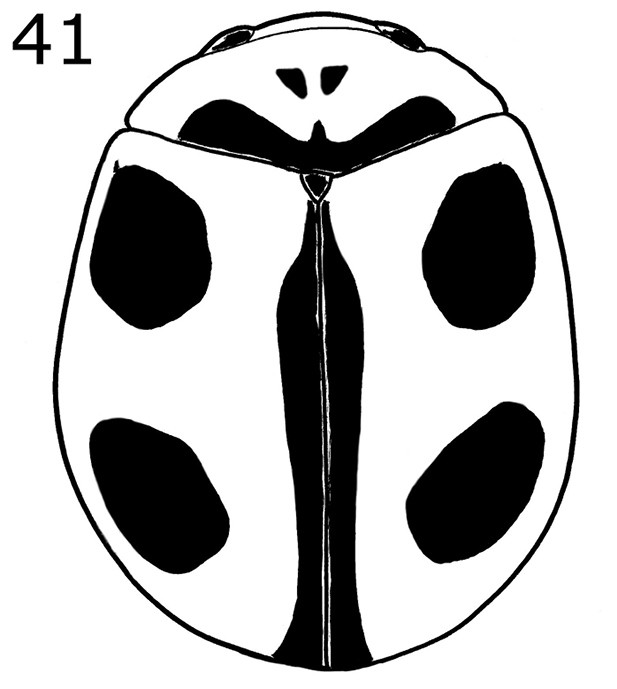

Scientific classification
- Kingdom: Animalia
- Phylum: Arthropoda
- Clade: Pancrustacea
- Class: Insecta
- Order: Coleoptera
- Suborder: Polyphaga
- Infraorder: Cucujiformia
- Family: Coccinellidae
- Genus: Brachiacantha
- Species: B. dentata

Binomial name
- Brachiacantha dentata Nestor-Arriola, Toledo-Hernández and Solís, 2021

= Brachiacantha dentata =

Species of beetle

Brachiacantha dentata is a species of beetle of the family Coccinellidae. It is found in Costa Rica.

== Description ==
Adults reach a length of about 2.6–3.2 mm (0.10–0.13 in). The dorsal colour is pale yellow with brown or black spots, while they are brown ventrally.

== Etymology ==
The species name is derived from Latin dentatus (meaning toothed) and refers to the ventral spurs or teeth.
