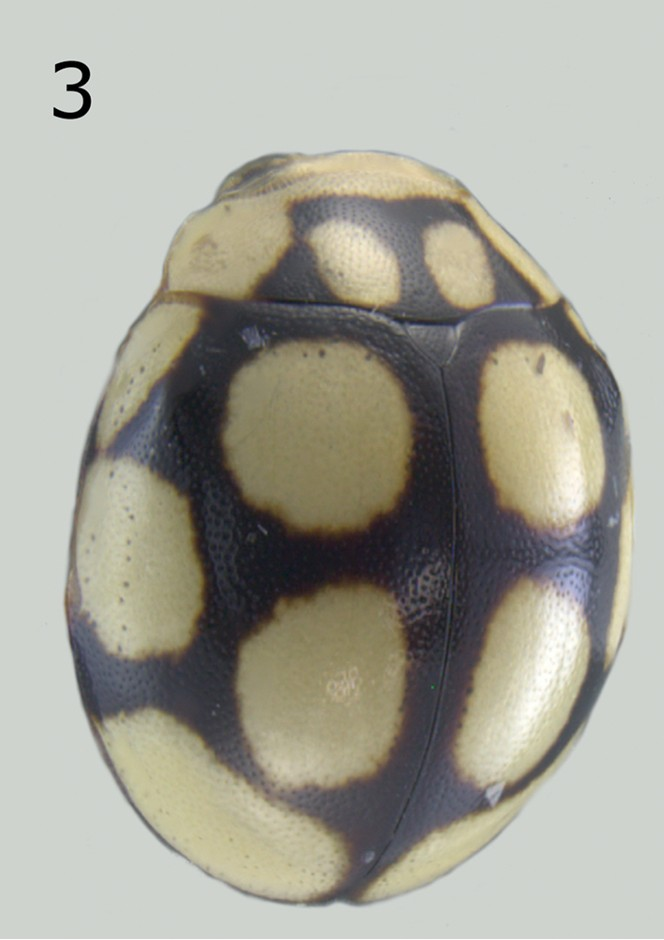

Scientific classification
- Kingdom: Animalia
- Phylum: Arthropoda
- Clade: Pancrustacea
- Class: Insecta
- Order: Coleoptera
- Suborder: Polyphaga
- Infraorder: Cucujiformia
- Family: Coccinellidae
- Genus: Brachiacantha
- Species: B. fenestrata

Binomial name
- Brachiacantha fenestrata Gorham, 1894

= Brachiacantha fenestrata =

Species of beetle

Brachiacantha fenestrata is a species of beetle of the family Coccinellidae. It is found in Costa Rica and Panama.

== Description ==
They are black or dark brown dorsally, the pronotum with the anterior angles, the anterior margin and two convergent oval spots on the center of the disc pale yellow. Each elytron has five pale spots. In some specimens the elytral spots are fused.
