= Brachiacantha blandula =

Scientific classification
- Kingdom: Animalia
- Phylum: Arthropoda
- Clade: Pancrustacea
- Class: Insecta
- Order: Coleoptera
- Suborder: Polyphaga
- Infraorder: Cucujiformia
- Family: Coccinellidae
- Genus: Brachiacantha
- Species: B. blandula

Binomial name
- Brachiacantha blandula (Weise, 1902)

Synonyms
- Hyperaspis blandula Weise, 1902

Species of beetle

Brachiacantha blandula is a species of beetle of the family Coccinellidae. It is found in Bolivia, Brazil and Peru.

== Description ==
Adults reach a length of about 2.6–3.0 mm. They have a yellow body and black, partly yellow head. The pronotum is black, except the anterior one-thenth and lateral one-twelfth, which are yellow. The elytron has a black border and three black spots.
