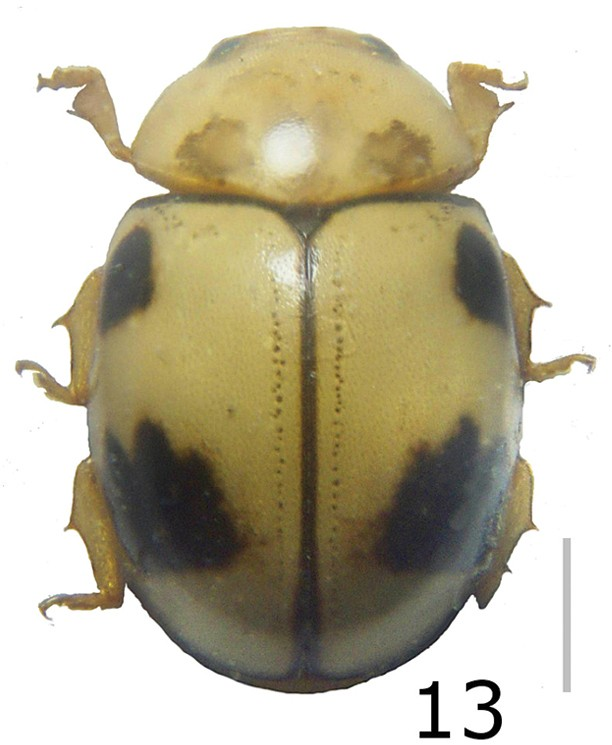

Scientific classification
- Kingdom: Animalia
- Phylum: Arthropoda
- Clade: Pancrustacea
- Class: Insecta
- Order: Coleoptera
- Suborder: Polyphaga
- Infraorder: Cucujiformia
- Family: Coccinellidae
- Genus: Brachiacantha
- Species: B. hexaspina

Binomial name
- Brachiacantha hexaspina Nestor-Arriola, Toledo-Hernández, Solís, González & Větrovec, 2021

= Brachiacantha hexaspina =

Species of beetle

Brachiacantha hexaspina is a species of beetle of the family Coccinellidae. It is found in Costa Rica and Panama.

== Description ==
Adults reach a length of about 3.6–4.6 mm (0.14–0.18 in). The dorsal colour is yellow with two black spots on each elytron. The pro-, meso-, and metatibia have an external tooth.

== Etymology ==
The species name is derived from Greek hexa (meaning six) and Latin spine (meaning thorn) and refers to the six teeth of the tibiae, long and curved like rose thorns.
