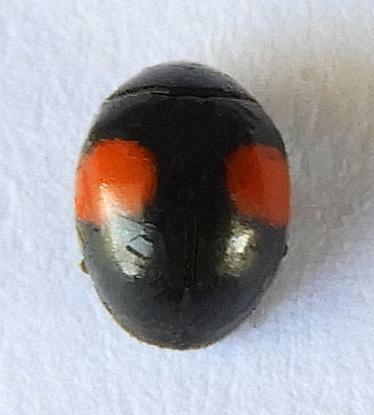

Scientific classification
- Kingdom: Animalia
- Phylum: Arthropoda
- Clade: Pancrustacea
- Class: Insecta
- Order: Coleoptera
- Suborder: Polyphaga
- Infraorder: Cucujiformia
- Family: Coccinellidae
- Genus: Brachiacantha
- Species: B. subfasciata

Binomial name
- Brachiacantha subfasciata Mulsant, 1850

= Brachiacantha subfasciata =

Species of beetle

Brachiacantha subfasciata is a species of lady beetle in the family Coccinellidae. It is found in Central America and North America, where it has been recorded from Arizona, Texas and Mexico. In the south, its range extends to Honduras.

== Description ==
Adults reach a length of about 3.50–4 mm. They have a yellow head. The pronotum of the males is black with a yellow anterior margin and a yellow area on the anterolateral angle. The pronotum of the females is black, sometimes with a small yellow area on the anterolateral angle. The elytron is black with a median orange band.
