= Brachiacantha robustihamata =

Scientific classification
- Kingdom: Animalia
- Phylum: Arthropoda
- Clade: Pancrustacea
- Class: Insecta
- Order: Coleoptera
- Suborder: Polyphaga
- Infraorder: Cucujiformia
- Family: Coccinellidae
- Genus: Brachiacantha
- Species: B. robustihamata

Binomial name
- Brachiacantha robustihamata Nestor-Arriola & Toledo-Hernández, 2017

Species of beetle

Brachiacantha robustihamata is a species of beetle of the family Coccinellidae. It is found in Guatemala and Costa Rica.

== Description ==
Adults reach a length of about 4.5 mm (0.18 in). They have an oval body. There are three spots on each elytron, including an incomplete transversal band. The third ventrite has a small narrow cusp at each side of the middle.
