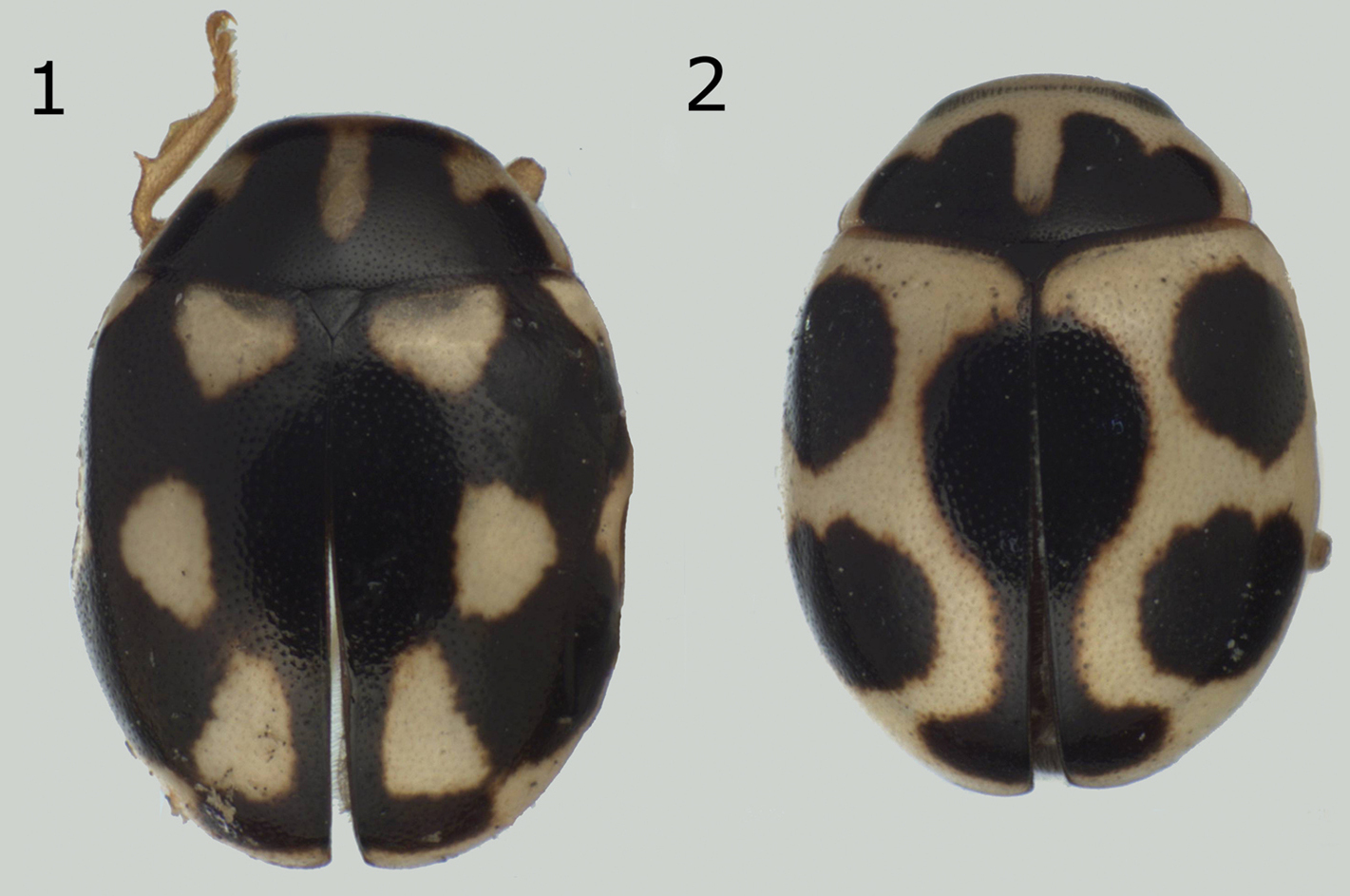
- two forms of B. lepida, 2 is more typical

Scientific classification
- Kingdom: Animalia
- Phylum: Arthropoda
- Clade: Pancrustacea
- Class: Insecta
- Order: Coleoptera
- Suborder: Polyphaga
- Infraorder: Cucujiformia
- Family: Coccinellidae
- Genus: Brachiacantha
- Species: B. lepida

Binomial name
- Brachiacantha lepida Mulsant, 1850

Synonyms
- Brachiacantha duodecimguttata Leng, 1911

= Brachiacantha lepida =

Species of beetle

Brachiacantha lepida is a species of lady beetle in the family Coccinellidae. It is found in Central America, where it has been recorded from Mexico to Costa Rica.

== Description ==
Adults reach a length of about 2.50-3.60 mm. They have a yellow head. The pronotum has a black area in the basal half. The elytron is yellow with two black spots and a discal and apical spot.
