= Brachiacantha darlene =

Scientific classification
- Kingdom: Animalia
- Phylum: Arthropoda
- Clade: Pancrustacea
- Class: Insecta
- Order: Coleoptera
- Suborder: Polyphaga
- Infraorder: Cucujiformia
- Family: Coccinellidae
- Genus: Brachiacantha
- Species: B. darlene

Binomial name
- Brachiacantha darlene Gordon & Canepari, 2014

Species of beetle

Brachiacantha darlene is a species of beetle of the family Coccinellidae. It is found in Peru, Bolivia and Ecuador.

== Description ==
Adults reach a length of about 2.0–2.7 mm. They have a yellow body. The pronotum has a black marking and two triangular brown spots. The elytron is brown with five yellow spots.
