= Brachiacantha hazel =

Scientific classification
- Kingdom: Animalia
- Phylum: Arthropoda
- Clade: Pancrustacea
- Class: Insecta
- Order: Coleoptera
- Suborder: Polyphaga
- Infraorder: Cucujiformia
- Family: Coccinellidae
- Genus: Brachiacantha
- Species: B. hazel

Binomial name
- Brachiacantha hazel Gordon & Canepari, 2014

Species of beetle

Brachiacantha hazel is a species of beetle of the family Coccinellidae. It is found in Peru.

== Description ==
Adults reach a length of about 3.3 mm. They have a yellow body, with some black markings on the head. The pronotum has a large black marking. The elytron is yellow with a black margin and four black spots.
