= Brachiacantha conjuncta =

Scientific classification
- Kingdom: Animalia
- Phylum: Arthropoda
- Clade: Pancrustacea
- Class: Insecta
- Order: Coleoptera
- Suborder: Polyphaga
- Infraorder: Cucujiformia
- Family: Coccinellidae
- Genus: Brachiacantha
- Species: B. conjuncta

Binomial name
- Brachiacantha conjuncta Mulsant, 1850

Synonyms
- Brachyacantha conjuncta

Species of beetle

Brachiacantha conjuncta is a species of beetle of the family Coccinellidae. It is found in Mexico (Durango, Guerrero, Morelos, Oaxaca, Puebla) and Costa Rica.
