= Brachiacantha uteella =

Scientific classification
- Kingdom: Animalia
- Phylum: Arthropoda
- Clade: Pancrustacea
- Class: Insecta
- Order: Coleoptera
- Suborder: Polyphaga
- Infraorder: Cucujiformia
- Family: Coccinellidae
- Genus: Brachiacantha
- Species: B. uteella

Binomial name
- Brachiacantha uteella Casey, 1908

Synonyms
- Brachiacantha fenyesi Leng, 1911; Brachiacantha lengi Nunenmacher, 1912

Species of beetle

Brachiacantha uteella is a species of lady beetle in the family Coccinellidae. It is found in North America, where it has been recorded from British Columbia, Arizona, California, Colorado, Idaho, Montana, Nevada, New Mexico, Oregon, South Dakota, Washington and Wyoming.

== Description ==
Adults reach a length of about 2.60-4.60 mm. The pronotum of the males is black with a yellow anterior margin and anterolateral angle. The elytron is usually black with five yellow spots.
