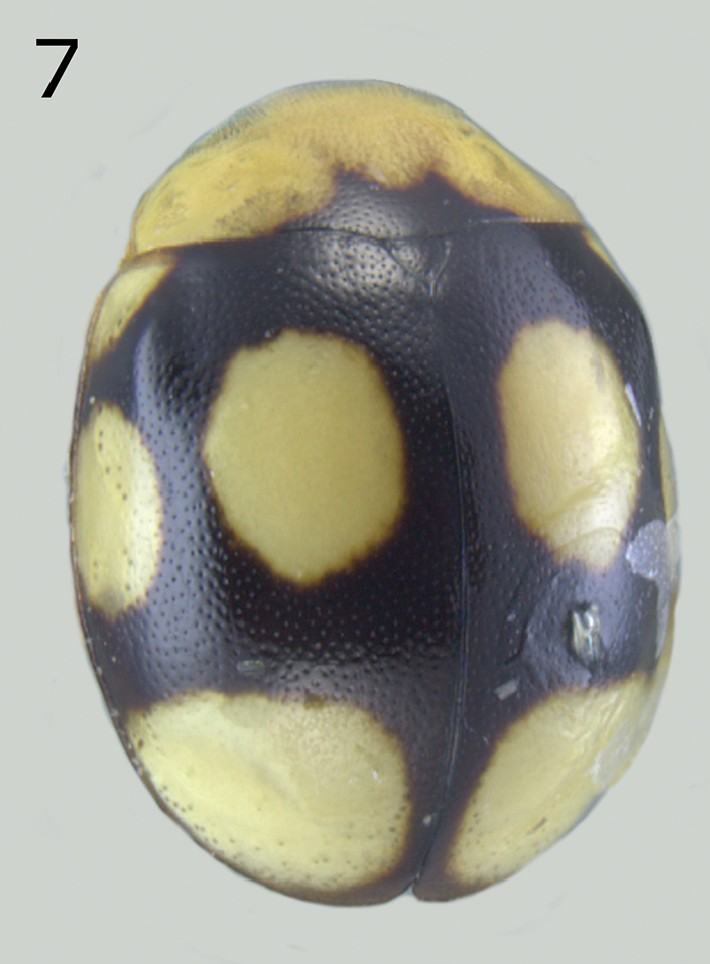

Scientific classification
- Kingdom: Animalia
- Phylum: Arthropoda
- Clade: Pancrustacea
- Class: Insecta
- Order: Coleoptera
- Suborder: Polyphaga
- Infraorder: Cucujiformia
- Family: Coccinellidae
- Genus: Brachiacantha
- Species: B. isthmena

Binomial name
- Brachiacantha isthmena Nestor-Arriola, Toledo-Hernández and Solís, 2021

= Brachiacantha isthmena =

Species of beetle

Brachiacantha isthmena is a species of beetle of the family Coccinellidae. It is found in Costa Rica and Panama.

== Description ==
Adults reach a length of about 3 mm (0.12 in). The dorsal colour is black or dark brown, with the pronotum almost completely yellow. Each elytron has three or four yellow spots. The male abdomen has a setal tuft on the first ventrite and several ventrites emarginated and depressed.

== Etymology ==
The species name refers to the Panamá isthmus.
