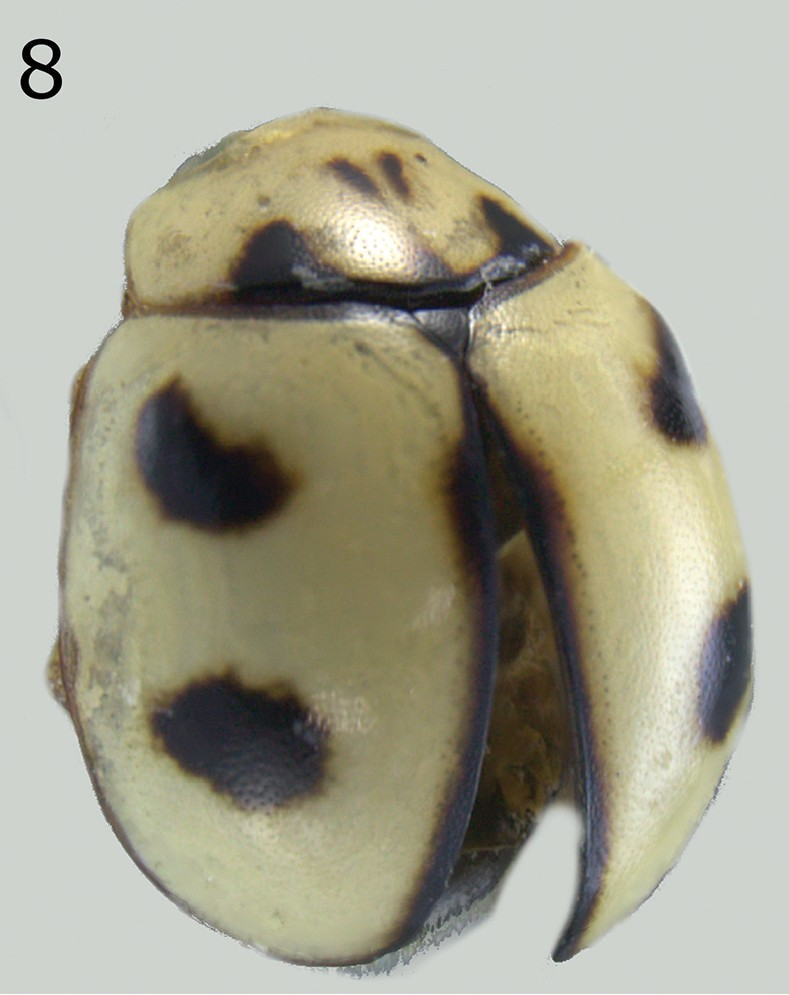

Scientific classification
- Kingdom: Animalia
- Phylum: Arthropoda
- Clade: Pancrustacea
- Class: Insecta
- Order: Coleoptera
- Suborder: Polyphaga
- Infraorder: Cucujiformia
- Family: Coccinellidae
- Genus: Brachiacantha
- Species: B. cachensis

Binomial name
- Brachiacantha cachensis (Gorham, 1894)

Synonyms
- Brachyacantha cachensis

= Brachiacantha cachensis =

Species of beetle

Brachiacantha cachensis is a species of beetle of the family Coccinellidae. It is found in Costa Rica and Panama.

== Description ==
The dorsal colour is pale yellow to grey with brown or black spots.
