= Brachiacantha steineri =

Scientific classification
- Kingdom: Animalia
- Phylum: Arthropoda
- Clade: Pancrustacea
- Class: Insecta
- Order: Coleoptera
- Suborder: Polyphaga
- Infraorder: Cucujiformia
- Family: Coccinellidae
- Genus: Brachiacantha
- Species: B. steineri

Binomial name
- Brachiacantha steineri Gordon & Canepari, 2014

Species of beetle

Brachiacantha steineri is a species of beetle of the family Coccinellidae. It is found in Ecuador.

== Description ==
Based on the holotype, a female, adults reach a length of about 3.4 mm (0.13 in). They have a black body and yellow head. The pronotum has a black marking. The lateral border of the elytron is yellow and there are two yellow vittae.

== Etymology ==
The species is named in honour of the collector, Warren Steiner, a coleopterist at the Smithsonian Institution's Department of Entomology.
