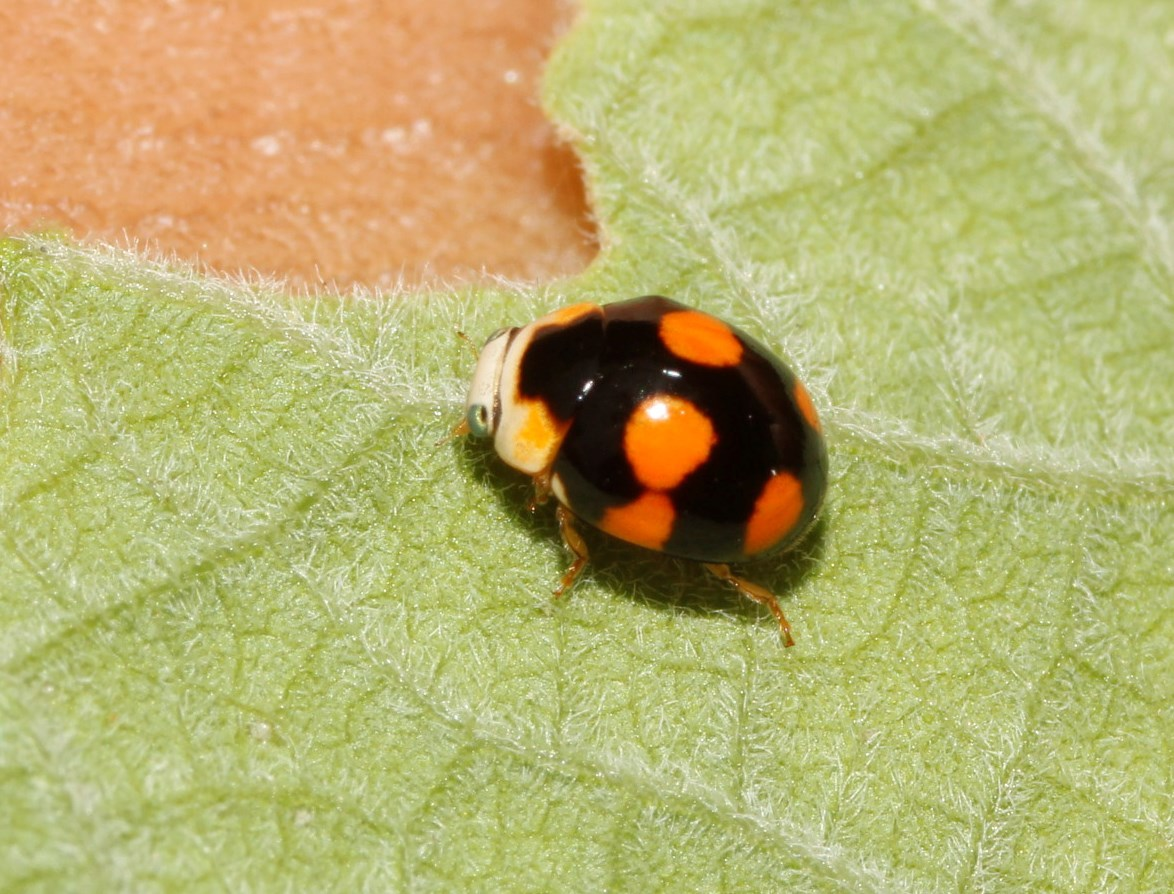

Scientific classification
- Kingdom: Animalia
- Phylum: Arthropoda
- Clade: Pancrustacea
- Class: Insecta
- Order: Coleoptera
- Suborder: Polyphaga
- Infraorder: Cucujiformia
- Family: Coccinellidae
- Genus: Brachiacantha
- Species: B. bistripustulata

Binomial name
- Brachiacantha bistripustulata (Fabricius, 1801)

Synonyms
- Coccinella bistripustulata Fabricius, 1801; Brachyacantha bis-tripustulata; Brachyacantha bistripustulata var. guttata Weise, 1885; Brachyacantha bistripustulata ab. decora Casey, 1899; Brachyacantha bistripustulata var. quichiana Leng, 1911; Brachyacantha bistripustulata var. minor Leng, 1911; Brachyacantha bistripustulata var. obscura Leng, 1911; Coccinella laevis Thunberg, 1781 (nomen oblitum); Brachyacantha decora Casey, 1899

= Brachiacantha bistripustulata =

Species of beetle

Brachiacantha bistripustulata, the decorated lady beetle, is a species of beetle of the Coccinellidae family. It is found from Mexico and Central America to Brazil and Peru. It is also found on Cuba and Jamaica and in the southern United States (Texas, Arizona and Florida).

== Description ==
Adults reach a length of about 3-4.5 mm. They have a yellow body. The pronotum has a large black marking. The elytron is black with four yellow spots.
