= Brachiacantha bollii =

Scientific classification
- Kingdom: Animalia
- Phylum: Arthropoda
- Clade: Pancrustacea
- Class: Insecta
- Order: Coleoptera
- Suborder: Polyphaga
- Infraorder: Cucujiformia
- Family: Coccinellidae
- Genus: Brachiacantha
- Species: B. bollii

Binomial name
- Brachiacantha bollii Crotch, 1873

Species of beetle

Brachiacantha bollii, or Boll's lady beetle, is a species of lady beetle in the family Coccinellidae. It is found in North America, where it has been recorded from Louisiana and Texas.

== Description ==
Adults reach a length of about 2.40–3 mm. They have a yellow head. The pronotum of the males is black with the anterior one-third yellow, while the pronotum of the females is black with a yellow anterolateral angle. The elytron has five large round spots.
