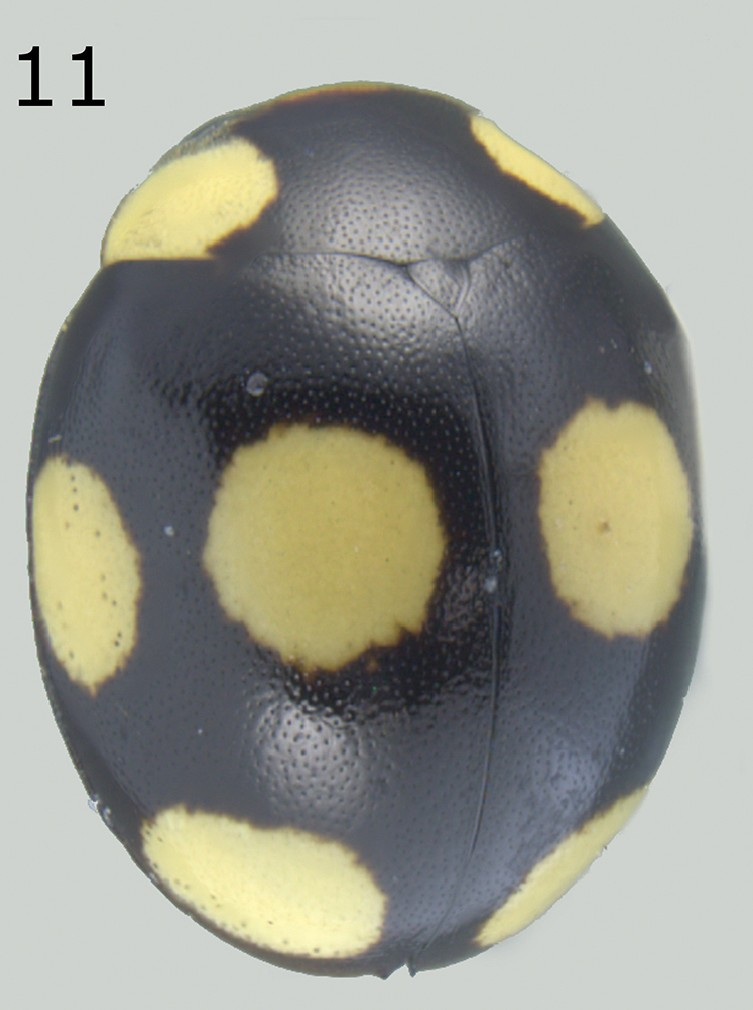

Scientific classification
- Kingdom: Animalia
- Phylum: Arthropoda
- Clade: Pancrustacea
- Class: Insecta
- Order: Coleoptera
- Suborder: Polyphaga
- Infraorder: Cucujiformia
- Family: Coccinellidae
- Genus: Brachiacantha
- Species: B. mimica

Binomial name
- Brachiacantha mimica Nestor-Arriola, Toledo-Hernández, Solís, González & Větrovec, 2021

= Brachiacantha mimica =

Species of beetle

Brachiacantha mimica is a species of beetle of the family Coccinellidae. It is found in Guatemala.

== Description ==
Adults reach a length of about 2.8 mm (0.11 in). The dorsal colour is black with three pale yellow spots. The protibial tooth is small. The apical elytral suture is dentiform.

== Etymology ==
The species name refers to its similarity to other Brachiacantha species.
