= Brachiacantha stephani =

Scientific classification
- Kingdom: Animalia
- Phylum: Arthropoda
- Clade: Pancrustacea
- Class: Insecta
- Order: Coleoptera
- Suborder: Polyphaga
- Infraorder: Cucujiformia
- Family: Coccinellidae
- Genus: Brachiacantha
- Species: B. stephani

Binomial name
- Brachiacantha stephani Gordon, 1985

Species of beetle

Brachiacantha stephani, or Stephan's lady beetle, is a species of lady beetle in the family Coccinellidae. It is found in North America, where it has been recorded from Arizona.

== Description ==
Adults reach a length of about 4 mm (males) and 4.5 mm (females). They have a black head with an orange spot. The pronotum is black with a yellow anterior margin and a small reddish yellow lateral area. The elytron is black with a reddish yellow apical spot and median band.

== Etymology ==
This species is named for Karl Stephan, the collector of part of the type series.
