= Brachiacantha bipartita =

Scientific classification
- Kingdom: Animalia
- Phylum: Arthropoda
- Clade: Pancrustacea
- Class: Insecta
- Order: Coleoptera
- Suborder: Polyphaga
- Infraorder: Cucujiformia
- Family: Coccinellidae
- Genus: Brachiacantha
- Species: B. bipartita

Binomial name
- Brachiacantha bipartita Mulsant, 1850

Synonyms
- Brachyacantha bipartita

Species of beetle

Brachiacantha bipartita is a species of beetle of the family Coccinellidae. It is found in Mexico and Central America (including Costa Rica and Guatemala).

== Description ==
They have an oval body. The elytra are orange and the head is pale yellow in males, while it is black in females. Males have a black pronotum with pale yellow to yellowish white lateral and anterior margins.

== Life history ==
This species has been collected on coffee plants (Coffea species).
