= Brachiacantha pygidialis =

Scientific classification
- Kingdom: Animalia
- Phylum: Arthropoda
- Clade: Pancrustacea
- Class: Insecta
- Order: Coleoptera
- Suborder: Polyphaga
- Infraorder: Cucujiformia
- Family: Coccinellidae
- Genus: Brachiacantha
- Species: B. pygidialis

Binomial name
- Brachiacantha pygidialis (Mulsant, 1850)

Synonyms
- Brachyacantha pygidialis; Brachiacantha brevihamata Nestor-Arriola & Toledo-Hernández, 2017

Species of beetle

Brachiacantha pygidialis is a species of beetle of the family Coccinellidae. It is found in Mexico (Michoacán, México State, Morelos, Veracruz).

== Description ==
Adults reach a length of about 3.7–4 mm (0.15–0.16 in). They have a oval, slightly elongated body. They have a black body with a yellow head. The anterolateral angles and the anterior and lateral borders of the pronotum are yellowish orange. There are five yellowish orange spots on each elytron.

== Taxonomy ==
Since the description of Brachiacantha brevihamata, its similarity pygidialis was evident, but it was considered a separate species due to the lack of the pygidial spot. Later research has recovered a specimen with a yellowish pygidial spot, with genitalia consistent with brevihamata. Furthermore, pygidialis is known to have different colour morphs.
