= Brachiacantha bahiensis =

Scientific classification
- Kingdom: Animalia
- Phylum: Arthropoda
- Clade: Pancrustacea
- Class: Insecta
- Order: Coleoptera
- Suborder: Polyphaga
- Infraorder: Cucujiformia
- Family: Coccinellidae
- Genus: Brachiacantha
- Species: B. bahiensis

Binomial name
- Brachiacantha bahiensis Brèthes, 1925

Species of beetle

Brachiacantha bahiensis is a species of beetle of the family Coccinellidae. It is found in Brazil.

== Description ==
Adults reach a length of about 2.3–3.0 mm. They have a dark body and yellow head. The pronotum is yellow with a large black marking. The elytron is dark brown with five small yellow spots.
