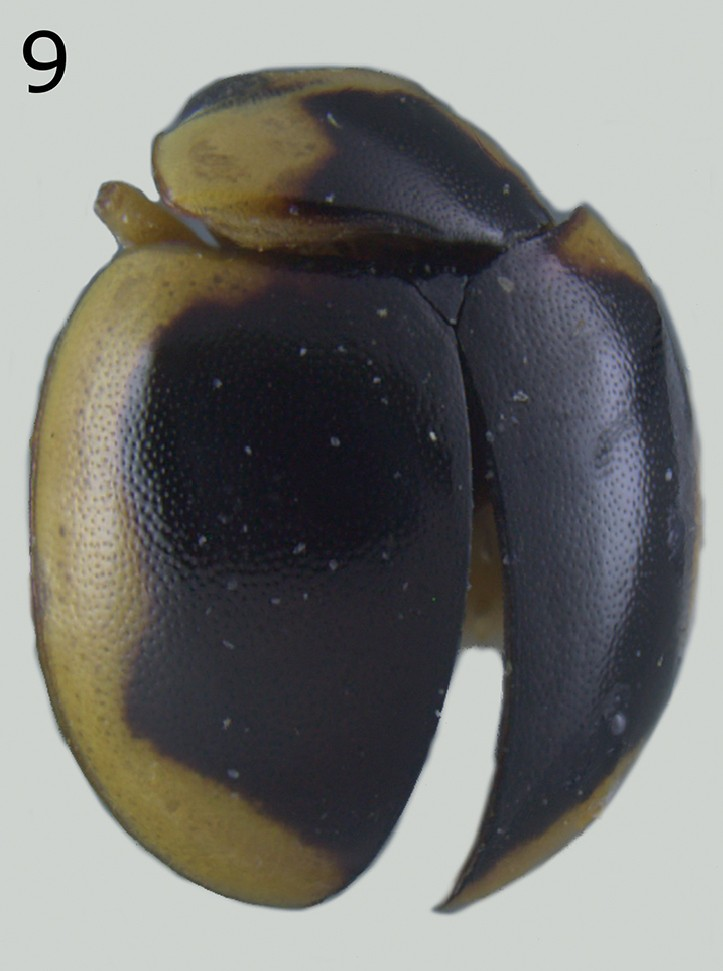

Scientific classification
- Kingdom: Animalia
- Phylum: Arthropoda
- Clade: Pancrustacea
- Class: Insecta
- Order: Coleoptera
- Suborder: Polyphaga
- Infraorder: Cucujiformia
- Family: Coccinellidae
- Genus: Brachiacantha
- Species: B. guatemalensis

Binomial name
- Brachiacantha guatemalensis (Gorham, 1894)

Synonyms
- Hyperaspis guatemalensis Gorham, 1894

= Brachiacantha guatemalensis =

Species of beetle

Brachiacantha guatemalensis is a species of beetle of the family Coccinellidae. It is found in Guatemala.

== Description ==
Adults reach a length of about 3 mm (0.12 in). They have a rounded and convex body. The dorsal colour is black, while the lateral angles and anterior border of the pronotum are yellow. Each elytron has an irregular yellow macula covering the area from the humeral angle to the posterior border. The ventral surface with the head, prosternum and metaventrite is black. The abdomen is yellow except the center of ventrites I-III, which are black. The legs, mouthparts and antennae are yellow.
