= Brachiacantha octosignata =

Scientific classification
- Kingdom: Animalia
- Phylum: Arthropoda
- Clade: Pancrustacea
- Class: Insecta
- Order: Coleoptera
- Suborder: Polyphaga
- Infraorder: Cucujiformia
- Family: Coccinellidae
- Genus: Brachiacantha
- Species: B. octosignata

Binomial name
- Brachiacantha octosignata Mader, 1958

Species of beetle

Brachiacantha octosignata is a species of beetle of the family Coccinellidae. It is found in Bolivia.

== Description ==
Adults reach a length of about 3 mm (0.12 in). They have an oval, moderately convex, shiny body. The head is light yellow in males and black in females, with a yellow spot. The pronotum is black, with a whitish-yellow spot on each side and a whitish-yellow basal spot. The anterior margin is edged in yellowish-red. The scutellum and elytra are black. Each elytron with four whitish-yellow spots. The pygidium is reddish, the underside is black and the legs are yellowish-red.
