= Brachiacantha armandi =

Scientific classification
- Kingdom: Animalia
- Phylum: Arthropoda
- Clade: Pancrustacea
- Class: Insecta
- Order: Coleoptera
- Suborder: Polyphaga
- Infraorder: Cucujiformia
- Family: Coccinellidae
- Genus: Brachiacantha
- Species: B. armandi

Binomial name
- Brachiacantha armandi (Mulsant, 1850)

Synonyms
- Cleothera armandi Mulsant, 1850

Species of beetle

Brachiacantha armandi is a species of beetle of the family Coccinellidae. It is found in Argentina and Brazil.

== Description ==
Adults reach a length of about 2.6 mm. They have a yellow body. The pronotum has a large black marking. The elytron is black with five small yellow spots.
