= Brachiacantha parva =

Scientific classification
- Kingdom: Animalia
- Phylum: Arthropoda
- Clade: Pancrustacea
- Class: Insecta
- Order: Coleoptera
- Suborder: Polyphaga
- Infraorder: Cucujiformia
- Family: Coccinellidae
- Genus: Brachiacantha
- Species: B. parva

Binomial name
- Brachiacantha parva (Mulsant, 1850)

Synonyms
- Cleothera billoti parva Mulsant, 1850

Species of beetle

Brachiacantha parva is a species of beetle of the family Coccinellidae. It is found in Brazil.

== Description ==
Adults reach a length of about 2.5 mm. They have a brown body and yellow head. The pronotum is yellow with a large brown marking. The elytron has five small yellow spots.
