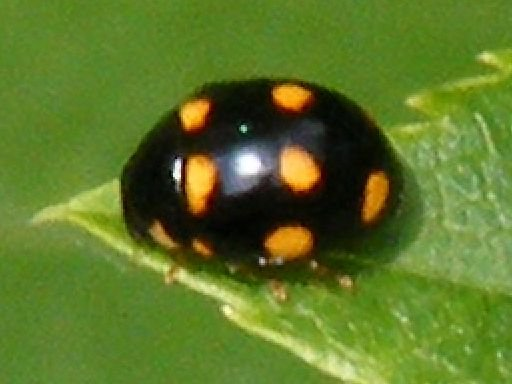
- Brachiacantha ursina

Scientific classification
- Kingdom: Animalia
- Phylum: Arthropoda
- Clade: Pancrustacea
- Class: Insecta
- Order: Coleoptera
- Suborder: Polyphaga
- Infraorder: Cucujiformia
- Family: Coccinellidae
- Tribe: Brachiacanthini
- Genus: Brachiacantha; Dejean, 1837

Synonyms
- Brachyacantha; Cleothera (Cyra) Mulsant, 1850; Cyra

= Brachiacantha =

Genus of beetles

Brachiacantha is a genus of lady beetles in the family Coccinellidae. There are at least 25 described species in Brachiacantha.

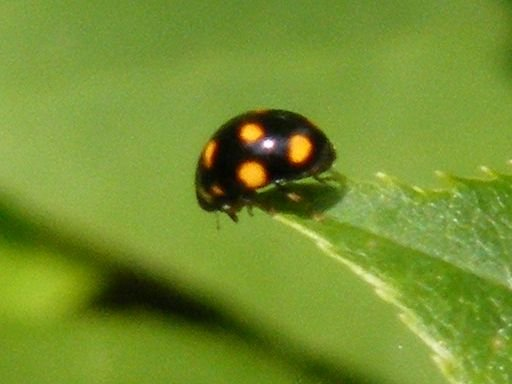
Brachiacantha ursina

== Species ==
- buckleyi group
  - Brachiacantha buckleyi Crotch, 1874
  - Brachiacantha charlotte Gordon & Canepari, 2014
- dentipes group/bistripustulata group
  - Brachiacantha barberi Gordon, 1985 (Barber's lady beetle)
  - Brachiacantha bistripustulata (Fabricius, 1801) (decorated lady beetle)
  - Brachiacantha dentipes (Fabricius, 1801)
  - Brachiacantha erythrura (Mulsant, 1850)
  - Brachiacantha robustihamata Nestor-Arriola & Toledo-Hernández, 2017
  - Brachiacantha subfasciata Mulsant, 1850
  - Brachiacantha truncata Nestor-Arriola & Toledo-Hernández, 2017
- sellata group
  - Brachiacantha sellata Mulsant, 1850
  - Brachiacantha bruchi Weise, 1904
  - Brachiacantha esther Gordon & Canepari, 2014
  - Brachiacantha pauline Gordon & Canepari, 2014
  - Brachiacantha emma Gordon & Canepari, 2014
  - Brachiacantha jamie Gordon & Canepari, 2014
  - Brachiacantha joanne Gordon & Canepari, 2014
- juanita group
  - Brachiacantha anita Gordon & Canepari, 2014
  - Brachiacantha aperta Weise, 1903
  - Brachiacantha armandi (Mulsant, 1850)
  - Brachiacantha bipartita Mulsant, 1850
  - Brachiacantha cathy Gordon & Canepari, 2014
  - Brachiacantha darlene Gordon & Canepari, 2014
  - Brachiacantha dentata Nestor-Arriola, Toledo-Hernández and Solís, 2021
  - Brachiacantha hazel Gordon & Canepari, 2014
  - Brachiacantha juanita Gordon & Canepari, 2014
  - Brachiacantha lauren Gordon & Canepari, 2014
  - Brachiacantha loricata (Mulsant, 1850)
  - Brachiacantha lynn Gordon & Canepari, 2014
  - Brachiacantha margaritae (Crotch, 1874)
  - Brachiacantha regina Gordon & Canepari, 2014
  - Brachiacantha octopustulata (Fabricius, 1801)
  - Brachiacantha octostigma Mulsant, 1850
  - Brachiacantha sally Gordon & Canepari, 2014
  - Brachiacantha veronica Gordon & Canepari, 2014
- jill group
  - Brachiacantha jill Gordon & Canepari, 2014
- blandula group
  - Brachiacantha blandula (Weise, 1902)
  - Brachiacantha april Gordon & Canepari, 2014
  - Brachiacantha clara Gordon & Canepari, 2014
- groendali group
  - Brachiacantha groendali (Mulsant, 1850)
  - Brachiacantha eva Gordon & Canepari, 2014
- debbie group
  - Brachiacantha debbie Gordon & Canepari, 2014
  - Brachiacantha monica Gordon & Canepari, 2014
  - Brachiacantha parva (Mulsant, 1850)
  - Brachiacantha amber Gordon & Canepari, 2014
- leslie group
  - Brachiacantha leslie Gordon & Canepari, 2014
- trimaculata group
  - Brachiacantha trimaculata Leng, 1911
- tucumanensis group
  - Brachiacantha aurantiapleura Nestor-Arriola, Solís and Toledo-Hernández, 2021
  - Brachiacantha eleanor Gordon & Canepari, 2014
  - Brachiacantha isthmena Nestor-Arriola, Toledo-Hernández and Solís, 2021
  - Brachiacantha tucumanensis Weise, 1911
  - Brachiacantha valerie Gordon & Canepari, 2014
- bahiensis group
  - Brachiacantha bahiensis Brèthes, 1925
  - Brachiacantha pseudoarrowi Gordon & Canepari, 2014
  - Brachiacantha danielle Gordon & Canepari, 2014
  - Brachiacantha gail Gordon & Canepari, 2014
- lepida group
  - Brachiacantha fenestrata Gorham, 1894
  - Brachiacantha indubitabilis Crotch, 1873
  - Brachiacantha lepida Mulsant, 1850
  - Brachiacantha nubes Nestor-Arriola, Toledo-Hernández and Solís, 2021
- ursina group
  - Brachiacantha guatemalensis (Gorham, 1894)
  - Brachiacantha ursina (Fabricius, 1787) (ursine spurleg lady beetle)
- invertita group
  - Brachiacantha invertita Nestor-Arriola, Toledo-Hernández and Solís, 2021
- cachensis group
  - Brachiacantha cachensis Gorham, 1894
  - Brachiacantha gorhami (Weise, 1904)
  - Brachiacantha hexaspina González, Větrovec and Nestor-Arriola, 2021
  - Brachiacantha mimica Nestor-Arriola and Toledo-Hernández, 2021
  - Brachiacantha papiliona Nestor-Arriola, Toledo-Hernández and Solís, 2021
  - Brachiacantha tica Nestor-Arriola, Toledo-Hernández and Solís, 2021
- group unassigned/unknown
  - Brachiacantha appropinquata (Mulsant, 1850)
  - Brachiacantha argentinica (Weise, 1922)
  - Brachiacantha bilineata Weise, 1902
  - Brachiacantha egae (Crotch, 1874)
  - Brachiacantha sicardi Leng, 1911
  - Brachiacantha steineri Gordon & Canepari, 2014
  - Brachiacantha albifrons (Say, 1824) (white-fronted lady beetle)
  - Brachiacantha arizonica Schaeffer, 1908 (Arizona lady beetle)
  - Brachiacantha blaisdelli Nunenmacher, 1909
  - Brachiacantha bollii Crotch, 1873 (Boll's lady beetle)
  - Brachiacantha decempustulata (Melsheimer, 1847) (ten-spotted spurleg)
  - Brachiacantha felina (Fabricius, 1775)
  - Brachiacantha floridensis Blatchley, 1916
  - Brachiacantha illustris Casey, 1899
  - Brachiacantha quadrillum LeConte, 1858
  - Brachiacantha quadripunctata Melsheimer, 1847
  - Brachiacantha querceti Schwarz, 1878 (oak lady beetle)
  - Brachiacantha rotunda Gordon, 1985
  - Brachiacantha schwarzi Gordon, 1985
  - Brachiacantha soltaui Gordon, 1985
  - Brachiacantha stephani Gordon, 1985 (Stephan's lady beetle)
  - Brachiacantha tau LeConte, 1859 (t-marked lady beetle)
  - Brachiacantha testudo Casey, 1899 (turtle lady)
  - Brachiacantha uteella Casey, 1908
  - Brachiacantha angulata Nestor-Arriola & Toledo-Hernández, 2017
  - Brachiacantha aymardi Gorham, 1894
  - Brachiacantha brevicuspidata Nestor-Arriola & Toledo-Hernández, 2017
  - Brachiacantha conjuncta Mulsant, 1850
  - Brachiacantha cryptocephalina Gorham, 1894
  - Brachiacantha distincta Nunenmacher, 1948
  - Brachiacantha mexicana Leng, 1911
  - Brachiacantha neglecta Nunenmacher, 1948
  - Brachiacantha octosignata Mader, 1958
  - Brachiacantha pygidialis Mulsant, 1850
  - Brachiacantha westwoodii Mulsant, 1850

== Selected former species ==
- Brachiacantha brevihamata Nestor-Arriola & Toledo-Hernández, 2017
