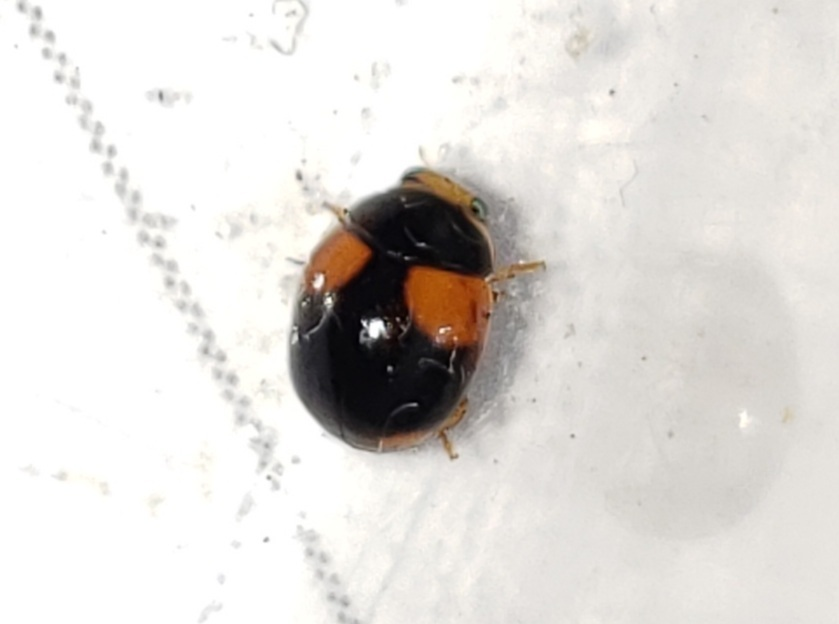

Scientific classification
- Kingdom: Animalia
- Phylum: Arthropoda
- Clade: Pancrustacea
- Class: Insecta
- Order: Coleoptera
- Suborder: Polyphaga
- Infraorder: Cucujiformia
- Family: Coccinellidae
- Genus: Brachiacantha
- Species: B. querceti

Binomial name
- Brachiacantha querceti Schwarz, 1878

= Brachiacantha querceti =

Species of beetle

Brachiacantha querceti, the oak lady beetle, is a species of lady beetle in the family Coccinellidae. It is found in North America, where it has been recorded from Florida.

== Description ==
Adults reach a length of about 2.20-2.80 mm. Males have a yellow head, while the head of the females is brown. The pronotum of the males is black with a yellow anterior margin and anterolateral angle, while the pronotum of the females is black or brown without markings. The elytron is black with two fused yellow spots and a large apical spot.
