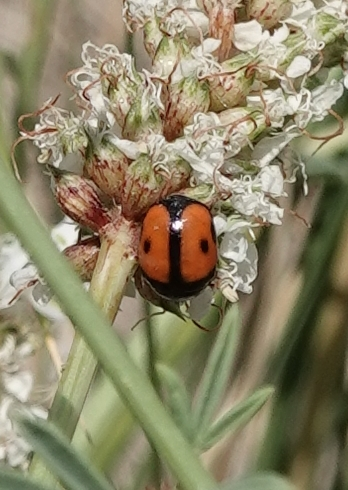

Scientific classification
- Kingdom: Animalia
- Phylum: Arthropoda
- Clade: Pancrustacea
- Class: Insecta
- Order: Coleoptera
- Suborder: Polyphaga
- Infraorder: Cucujiformia
- Family: Coccinellidae
- Genus: Brachiacantha
- Species: B. tau

Binomial name
- Brachiacantha tau LeConte, 1859

= Brachiacantha tau =

Species of beetle

Brachiacantha tau, the t-marked larkspur lady beetle, is a species of lady beetle in the family Coccinellidae. In the Brachiacantha genus, the oval-shaped shiny beetles are usually about 2–3 mm in length. The larvae are not usually encountered because they feed on scale insects within ant colonies. Adults are sometimes found on flowers or hunting within foliage in North America. It has been recorded from Kansas, Arizona, Colorado, Idaho, Montana, New Mexico, Texas and Utah.
