= Brachiacantha sicardi =

Scientific classification
- Kingdom: Animalia
- Phylum: Arthropoda
- Clade: Pancrustacea
- Class: Insecta
- Order: Coleoptera
- Suborder: Polyphaga
- Infraorder: Cucujiformia
- Family: Coccinellidae
- Genus: Brachiacantha
- Species: B. sicardi

Binomial name
- Brachiacantha sicardi Leng, 1911

Species of beetle

Brachiacantha sicardi is a species of beetle of the family Coccinellidae. It is found in Paraguay.

== Description ==
Adults reach a length of about 3.2 mm. They have a dark brown body. The anterolateral angle of the pronotum is triangularly yellow. The elytron has a long yellow marking and a small median spot.
