= Brachiacantha esther =

Scientific classification
- Kingdom: Animalia
- Phylum: Arthropoda
- Clade: Pancrustacea
- Class: Insecta
- Order: Coleoptera
- Suborder: Polyphaga
- Infraorder: Cucujiformia
- Family: Coccinellidae
- Genus: Brachiacantha
- Species: B. esther

Binomial name
- Brachiacantha esther Gordon & Canepari, 2014

Species of beetle

Brachiacantha esther is a species of beetle of the family Coccinellidae. It is found in Brazil.

== Description ==
Adults reach a length of about 3.4 mm. They have a yellow body. The pronotum has a small dark brown marking and two dark yellow oval spots. The elytron is dark brown with five large yellow spots.
