= Brachiacantha charlotte =

Scientific classification
- Kingdom: Animalia
- Phylum: Arthropoda
- Clade: Pancrustacea
- Class: Insecta
- Order: Coleoptera
- Suborder: Polyphaga
- Infraorder: Cucujiformia
- Family: Coccinellidae
- Genus: Brachiacantha
- Species: B. charlotte

Binomial name
- Brachiacantha charlotte Gordon & Canepari, 2014

Species of beetle

Brachiacantha charlotte is a species of beetle of the family Coccinellidae. It is found in Brazil.

== Description ==
Adults reach a length of about 2.8–3.0 mm. They have a black body and yellow head. The pronotum is yellow with a small black marking. The elytron has five yellow spots.
