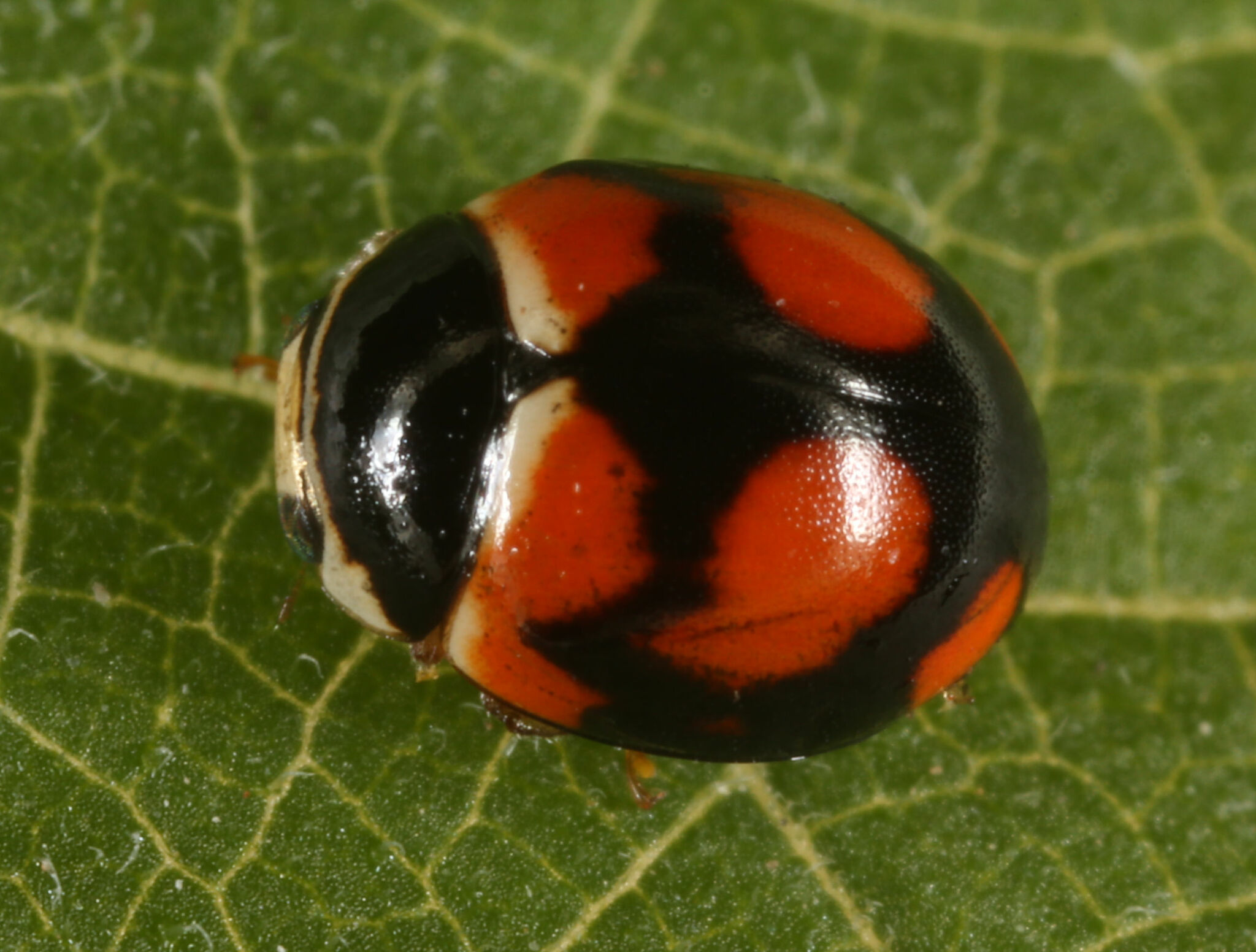

Scientific classification
- Kingdom: Animalia
- Phylum: Arthropoda
- Clade: Pancrustacea
- Class: Insecta
- Order: Coleoptera
- Suborder: Polyphaga
- Infraorder: Cucujiformia
- Family: Coccinellidae
- Genus: Brachiacantha
- Species: B. arizonica

Binomial name
- Brachiacantha arizonica Schaeffer, 1908

= Brachiacantha arizonica =

Species of beetle

Brachiacantha arizonica, the Arizona lady beetle, is a species of lady beetle in the family Coccinellidae. It is found in North America, where it has been recorded from Arizona.

== Description ==
Adults reach a length of about 2.90-3.60 mm. The pronotum has a yellow anterior margin and anterolateral angle. The elytron is black with four yellow spots.
