= Brachiacantha neglecta =

Scientific classification
- Kingdom: Animalia
- Phylum: Arthropoda
- Clade: Pancrustacea
- Class: Insecta
- Order: Coleoptera
- Suborder: Polyphaga
- Infraorder: Cucujiformia
- Family: Coccinellidae
- Genus: Brachiacantha
- Species: B. neglecta

Binomial name
- Brachiacantha neglecta Nunenmacher, 1948

Species of beetle

Brachiacantha neglecta is a species of beetle of the family Coccinellidae. It is found in Argentina (Entre Ríos Province).

== Description ==
Adults reach a length of about 4 mm (0.16 in). The head is black. The body is also black, but has yellow sides. The elytra are black with a yellow three-pointed star and two yellow spots. The ventral surface and legs are black.
