= Brachiacantha cryptocephalina =

Scientific classification
- Kingdom: Animalia
- Phylum: Arthropoda
- Clade: Pancrustacea
- Class: Insecta
- Order: Coleoptera
- Suborder: Polyphaga
- Infraorder: Cucujiformia
- Family: Coccinellidae
- Genus: Brachiacantha
- Species: B. cryptocephalina

Binomial name
- Brachiacantha cryptocephalina Gorham, 1894

Synonyms
- Brachyacantha cryptocephalina

Species of beetle

Brachiacantha cryptocephalina is a species of beetle of the family Coccinellidae. It is found in Mexico (Durango, Oaxaca, Puebla).
