= Brachiacantha april =

Scientific classification
- Kingdom: Animalia
- Phylum: Arthropoda
- Clade: Pancrustacea
- Class: Insecta
- Order: Coleoptera
- Suborder: Polyphaga
- Infraorder: Cucujiformia
- Family: Coccinellidae
- Genus: Brachiacantha
- Species: B. april

Binomial name
- Brachiacantha april Gordon & Canepari, 2014

Species of beetle

Brachiacantha april is a species of beetle of the family Coccinellidae. It is found in Brazil, Bolivia, Argentina and Peru.

== Description ==
Adults reach a length of about 2.0-2.7 mm. They have a yellow body and black, partly yellow head. The pronotum is entirely black except the anterolateral angle, which is yellow. The elytron is black with five small yellow spots.
