= Brachiacantha aymardi =

Scientific classification
- Kingdom: Animalia
- Phylum: Arthropoda
- Clade: Pancrustacea
- Class: Insecta
- Order: Coleoptera
- Suborder: Polyphaga
- Infraorder: Cucujiformia
- Family: Coccinellidae
- Genus: Brachiacantha
- Species: B. aymardi

Binomial name
- Brachiacantha aymardi Gorham, 1894

Synonyms
- Brachyacantha aymardi; Brachyacantha westwoodi ab. pulchella Weise, 1904

Species of beetle

Brachiacantha aymardi is a species of beetle of the family Coccinellidae. It is found in Mexico (Puebla, San Luis Potosí, Tlaxcala).
