= Brachiacantha joanne =

Scientific classification
- Kingdom: Animalia
- Phylum: Arthropoda
- Clade: Pancrustacea
- Class: Insecta
- Order: Coleoptera
- Suborder: Polyphaga
- Infraorder: Cucujiformia
- Family: Coccinellidae
- Genus: Brachiacantha
- Species: B. joanne

Binomial name
- Brachiacantha joanne Gordon & Canepari, 2014

Species of beetle

Brachiacantha joanne is a species of beetle of the family Coccinellidae. It is found in Argentina.

== Description ==
Adults reach a length of about 2.6 mm. They have a yellow body. The pronotum has a large black marking. The elytron is black with four large yellow areas.
