= Brachiacantha schwarzi =

Scientific classification
- Kingdom: Animalia
- Phylum: Arthropoda
- Clade: Pancrustacea
- Class: Insecta
- Order: Coleoptera
- Suborder: Polyphaga
- Infraorder: Cucujiformia
- Family: Coccinellidae
- Genus: Brachiacantha
- Species: B. schwarzi

Binomial name
- Brachiacantha schwarzi Gordon, 1985

Species of beetle

Brachiacantha schwarzi is a species of beetle of the family Coccinellidae. It is found in North America, where it has been recorded from Florida and Georgia.

== Description ==
Adults reach a length of about 2.30–3.20 mm. The pronotum of the males is black with a yellow anterior margin and anterolateral angle, while the pronotum of the females is black with a yellow anterolateral. The elytron is black with two fused yellow spots and a large apical spot.
