= Brachiacantha groendali =

Scientific classification
- Kingdom: Animalia
- Phylum: Arthropoda
- Clade: Pancrustacea
- Class: Insecta
- Order: Coleoptera
- Suborder: Polyphaga
- Infraorder: Cucujiformia
- Family: Coccinellidae
- Genus: Brachiacantha
- Species: B. groendali

Binomial name
- Brachiacantha groendali (Mulsant, 1850)

Synonyms
- Cleothera billoti groendali Mulsant, 1850; Brachyacantha propria Kirsch, 1876; Brachyacantha australe Leng, 1911; Brachyacantha manni Nunenmacher, 1912; Brachiacantha arrowi Brèthes, 1925

Species of beetle

Brachiacantha groendali is a species of beetle of the family Coccinellidae. It is found in Bolivia, Brazil and Peru.

== Description ==
Adults reach a length of about 2.0–2.6 mm. They have a yellow body. The pronotum has a black marking. The elytron is black with five small yellow spots.
