= Brachiacantha tucumanensis =

Scientific classification
- Kingdom: Animalia
- Phylum: Arthropoda
- Clade: Pancrustacea
- Class: Insecta
- Order: Coleoptera
- Suborder: Polyphaga
- Infraorder: Cucujiformia
- Family: Coccinellidae
- Genus: Brachiacantha
- Species: B. tucumanensis

Binomial name
- Brachiacantha tucumanensis Weise, 1911

Species of beetle

Brachiacantha tucumanensis is a species of beetle of the family Coccinellidae. It is found in Argentina.

== Description ==
Adults reach a length of about 2.1–2.4 mm. They have a black body and yellow head. The pronotum is yellow with a small oval marking. The elytron is black with five small yellow spots.
