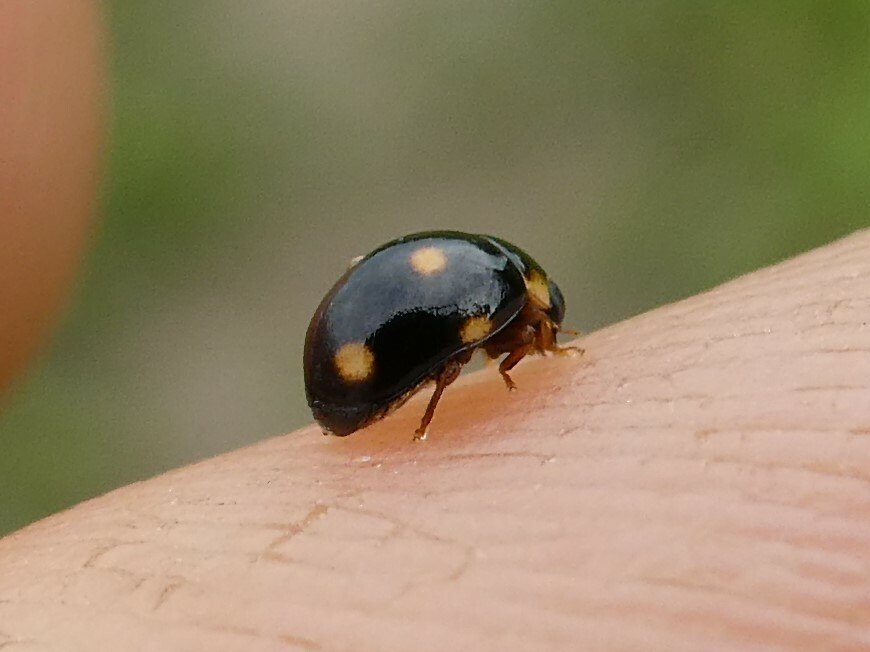

Scientific classification
- Kingdom: Animalia
- Phylum: Arthropoda
- Clade: Pancrustacea
- Class: Insecta
- Order: Coleoptera
- Suborder: Polyphaga
- Infraorder: Cucujiformia
- Family: Coccinellidae
- Genus: Brachiacantha
- Species: B. indubitabilis

Binomial name
- Brachiacantha indubitabilis Crotch, 1873

Synonyms
- Hyperaspis triplicans Casey, 1924; Hyperaspis triplicans microsticta Casey, 1924

= Brachiacantha indubitabilis =

Species of beetle

Brachiacantha indubitabilis is a species of lady beetle found in the family Coccinellidae. It is found in North America, where it has been recorded from Massachusetts and New York to North Carolina, west to Iowa and Illinois. In the south, its range extends through Mexico to Costa Rica and Guatemala.

== Description ==
Adults reach a length of about 2.5–3.2 mm (0.098–0.126 in). Males have a yellow head, while the head of the females is yellowish brown. The pronotum of the males is black with the anterior one-third yellow, while the pronotum of the females has the lateral one-fourth yellow. The elytron is black with three yellow spots.
