= Brachiacantha bilineata =

Scientific classification
- Kingdom: Animalia
- Phylum: Arthropoda
- Clade: Pancrustacea
- Class: Insecta
- Order: Coleoptera
- Suborder: Polyphaga
- Infraorder: Cucujiformia
- Family: Coccinellidae
- Genus: Brachiacantha
- Species: B. bilineata

Binomial name
- Brachiacantha bilineata Weise, 1902

Species of beetle

Brachiacantha bilineata is a species of beetle of the family Coccinellidae. It is found in Bolivia.

== Description ==
Adults reach a length of about 3.5 mm. They have a black body, the head with brown and dark brown areas. The pronotum is yellow with a black area. The elytron is yellow with black margins and a black vitta.
