= Brachiacantha margaritae =

Scientific classification
- Kingdom: Animalia
- Phylum: Arthropoda
- Clade: Pancrustacea
- Class: Insecta
- Order: Coleoptera
- Suborder: Polyphaga
- Infraorder: Cucujiformia
- Family: Coccinellidae
- Genus: Brachiacantha
- Species: B. margaritae

Binomial name
- Brachiacantha margaritae (Crotch, 1874)

Synonyms
- Hyperaspis margaritae Crotch, 1874

Species of beetle

Brachiacantha margaritae is a species of beetle of the family Coccinellidae. It is found in Colombia and Venezuela.

== Description ==
Adults reach a length of about 1.7–2.6 mm. They have a yellow body. The pronotum has a large black marking and two small light brown comma shaped spots. The elytron has a black border and two large black markings.
