= Brachiacantha loricata =

Scientific classification
- Kingdom: Animalia
- Phylum: Arthropoda
- Clade: Pancrustacea
- Class: Insecta
- Order: Coleoptera
- Suborder: Polyphaga
- Infraorder: Cucujiformia
- Family: Coccinellidae
- Genus: Brachiacantha
- Species: B. loricata

Binomial name
- Brachiacantha loricata (Mulsant, 1850)

Synonyms
- Cleothera loricata Mulsant, 1850

Species of beetle

Brachiacantha loricata is a species of beetle of the family Coccinellidae. It is found in Argentina, Brazil, Paraguay and Peru.

== Description ==
Adults reach a length of about 3.0–3.4 mm. They have a black body. The pronotum is yellow with a large black marking. The elytron is reddish yellow a black border, and two large black spots.
