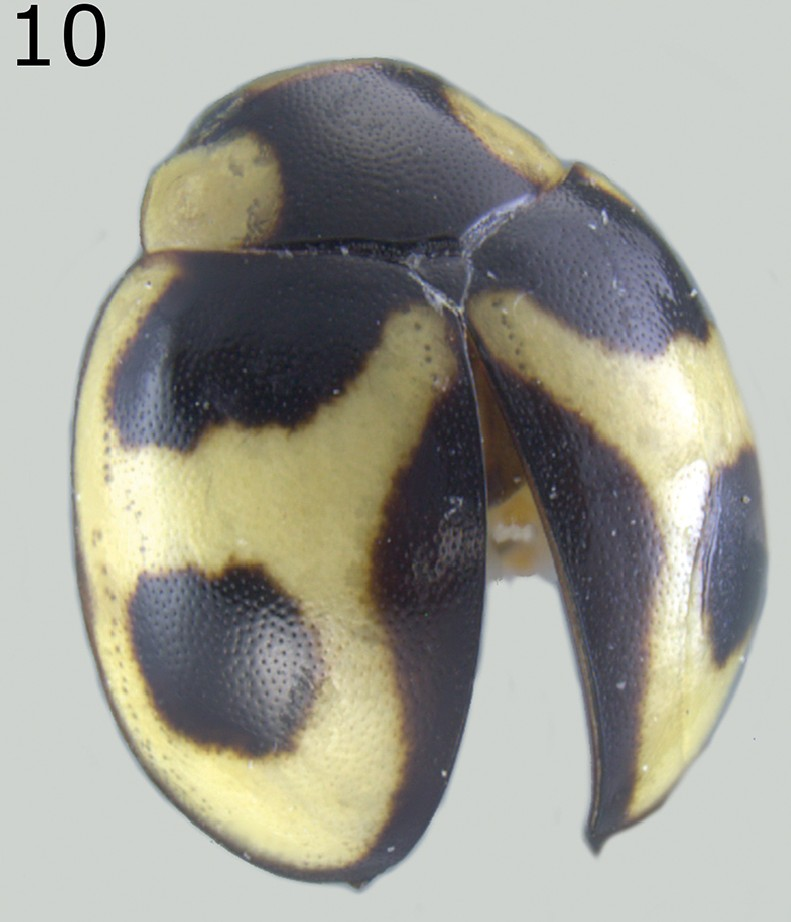

Scientific classification
- Kingdom: Animalia
- Phylum: Arthropoda
- Clade: Pancrustacea
- Class: Insecta
- Order: Coleoptera
- Suborder: Polyphaga
- Infraorder: Cucujiformia
- Family: Coccinellidae
- Genus: Brachiacantha
- Species: B. papiliona

Binomial name
- Brachiacantha papiliona Nestor-Arriola, Toledo-Hernández, Solís, González & Větrovec, 2021

= Brachiacantha papiliona =

Species of beetle

Brachiacantha papiliona is a species of beetle of the family Coccinellidae. It is found in Costa Rica and Panama.

== Description ==
Adults reach a length of about 3 mm (0.12 in). The dorsal colour is pale yellow with a black macula. Part of the elytral suture is black, and there is a sub-apical black spot, as well as a large black spot on the anterior margin.

== Etymology ==
The species name refers to the basal elytral spot in the shape of butterfly wings.
