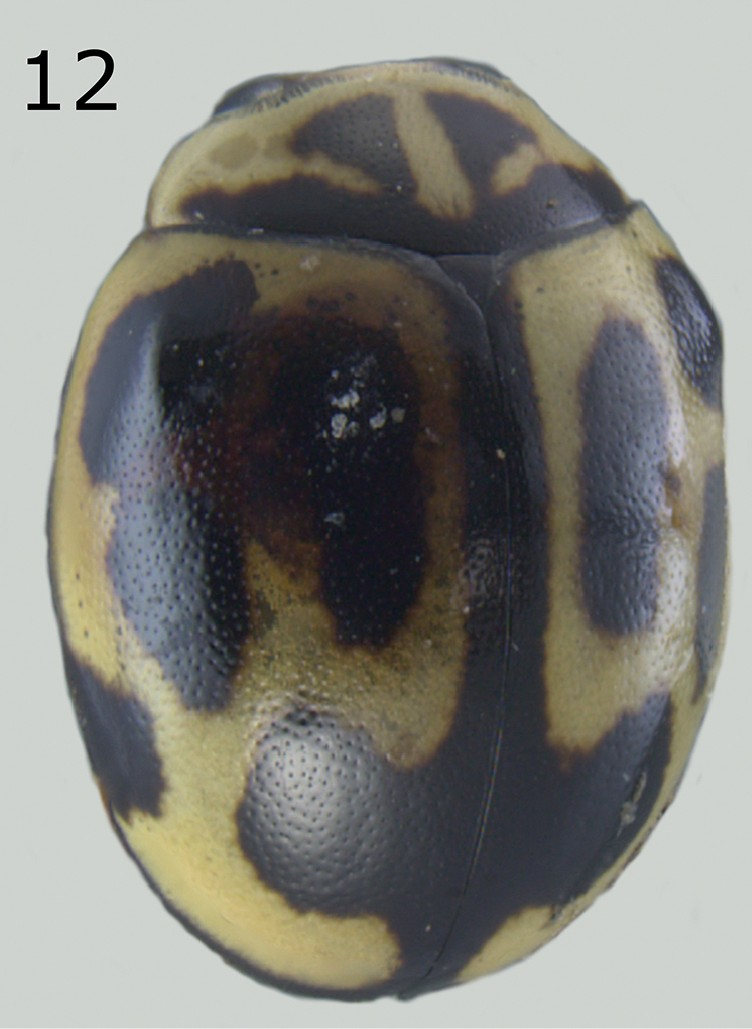

Scientific classification
- Kingdom: Animalia
- Phylum: Arthropoda
- Clade: Pancrustacea
- Class: Insecta
- Order: Coleoptera
- Suborder: Polyphaga
- Infraorder: Cucujiformia
- Family: Coccinellidae
- Genus: Brachiacantha
- Species: B. gorhami

Binomial name
- Brachiacantha gorhami (Weise, 1904)

Synonyms
- Coccinella pantherina Gorham, 1892 (preocc.); Coccinella gorhami Weise, 1904

= Brachiacantha gorhami =

Species of beetle

Brachiacantha gorhami is a species of beetle of the family Coccinellidae. It is found in El Salvador and Guatemala.

== Description ==
Adults reach a length of about 2.8 mm (0.11 in). The dorsal colour is pale yellow except for the head, which has a brown clypeus and black above the eyes. The pronotum has a black macula on the posterior margin and two large convergent subtriangular spots at the center. The scutellar shield is black. Each elytron has five black marks: a vitta on the elytral suture extending laterally in the second half of the elytron, an oval spot at the humeral callus, an elongated spot parallel to the sutural margin in the basal half of the elytron, an oval spot at middle and a small spot on the lateral margin in the apical half of the elytron. The ventral surface is brown.
