= Brachiacantha appropinquata =

Scientific classification
- Kingdom: Animalia
- Phylum: Arthropoda
- Clade: Pancrustacea
- Class: Insecta
- Order: Coleoptera
- Suborder: Polyphaga
- Infraorder: Cucujiformia
- Family: Coccinellidae
- Genus: Brachiacantha
- Species: B. appropinquata

Binomial name
- Brachiacantha appropinquata (Mulsant, 1850)

Synonyms
- Hyperaspis flavoguttata appropinquata Mulsant, 1850

Species of beetle

Brachiacantha appropinquata is a species of beetle of the family Coccinellidae. It is found in Brazil.

== Description ==
Adults reach a length of about 3.3 mm. They have a black body. The pronotum has a yellow anterior pronotal margin. The elytron has three yellow spots.
