= Brachiacantha angulata =

Scientific classification
- Kingdom: Animalia
- Phylum: Arthropoda
- Clade: Pancrustacea
- Class: Insecta
- Order: Coleoptera
- Suborder: Polyphaga
- Infraorder: Cucujiformia
- Family: Coccinellidae
- Genus: Brachiacantha
- Species: B. angulata

Binomial name
- Brachiacantha angulata Nestor-Arriola & Toledo-Hernández, 2017

Species of beetle

Brachiacantha angulata is a species of beetle of the family Coccinellidae. It is found in Mexico (Jalisco, Morelos, Guerrero).

== Description ==
Adults reach a length of about 3.1–4.5 mm (0.12–0.18 in). The dorsal colour is black black with a pale yellow head. The anterolateral angles and the anterior border of the pronotum are pale yellow. Each elytron has four orange spots. The ventral surface is black, but the antennae are yellow with the two apical articles dark brown. The legs are also yellow.

== Etymology ==
The species name is derived from Latin angulatus (meaning with angles) and refers to the angulated apex of the basal lobe of the male genitalia.
