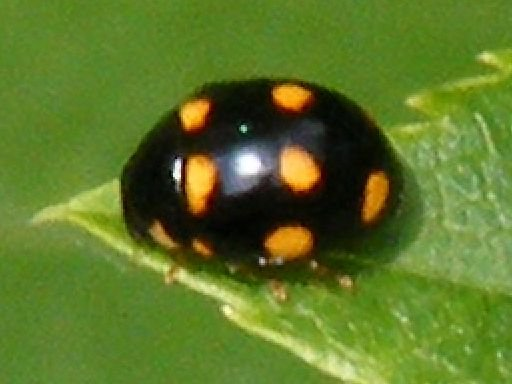

Scientific classification
- Kingdom: Animalia
- Phylum: Arthropoda
- Clade: Pancrustacea
- Class: Insecta
- Order: Coleoptera
- Suborder: Polyphaga
- Infraorder: Cucujiformia
- Family: Coccinellidae
- Genus: Brachiacantha
- Species: B. ursina

Binomial name
- Brachiacantha ursina (Fabricius, 1787)

Synonyms
- Coccinella ursina Fabricius, 1787; Brachiacantha congruens Casey, 1899

= Brachiacantha ursina =

Species of beetle

Brachiacantha ursina, known generally as the ursine spurleg lady beetle or orange-spotted lady beetle, is a species of lady beetle in the family Coccinellidae. It is found in North America, where it has been recorded from Nova Scotia to South Carolina, west to Manitoba and Iowa.

== Description ==
Adults reach a length of about 3–4 mm. The pronotum of the males is black with a yellow anterior margin and anterolateral angle. The elytron has five yellow spots.

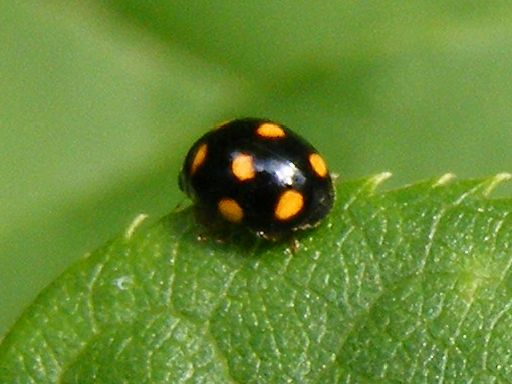
Ursine spurleg lady beetle, Brachiacantha ursina

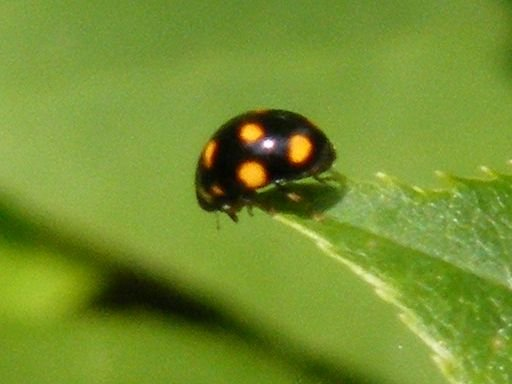
Ursine spurleg lady beetle, Brachiacantha ursina
