= Brachiacantha floridensis =

Scientific classification
- Kingdom: Animalia
- Phylum: Arthropoda
- Clade: Pancrustacea
- Class: Insecta
- Order: Coleoptera
- Suborder: Polyphaga
- Infraorder: Cucujiformia
- Family: Coccinellidae
- Genus: Brachiacantha
- Species: B. floridensis

Binomial name
- Brachiacantha floridensis Blatchley, 1916

Species of beetle

Brachiacantha floridensis is a species of beetle of the family Coccinellidae. It is found in North America, where it has been recorded from Florida.

== Description ==
Adults reach a length of about 2.50 mm. Males have a yellow head, while the head of the females is black with a yellow area. The pronotum of the males is black with the basal one-third yellow, while the pronotum of the females is black with a yellow anterolateral angle. The elytron has apical, basal and humeral spots.
