= Brachiacantha clara =

Scientific classification
- Kingdom: Animalia
- Phylum: Arthropoda
- Clade: Pancrustacea
- Class: Insecta
- Order: Coleoptera
- Suborder: Polyphaga
- Infraorder: Cucujiformia
- Family: Coccinellidae
- Genus: Brachiacantha
- Species: B. clara

Binomial name
- Brachiacantha clara Gordon & Canepari, 2014

Species of beetle

Brachiacantha clara is a species of beetle of the family Coccinellidae. It is found in Brazil.

== Description ==
Adults reach a length of about 3 mm. They have a black body. The pronotum is entirely black with a small yellow spot. The elytron is black with one yellowish red oval spot.
