= Brachiacantha trimaculata =

Scientific classification
- Kingdom: Animalia
- Phylum: Arthropoda
- Clade: Pancrustacea
- Class: Insecta
- Order: Coleoptera
- Suborder: Polyphaga
- Infraorder: Cucujiformia
- Family: Coccinellidae
- Genus: Brachiacantha
- Species: B. trimaculata

Binomial name
- Brachiacantha trimaculata Leng, 1911

Species of beetle

Brachiacantha trimaculata is a species of beetle of the family Coccinellidae. It is found in Argentina and Paraguay.

== Description ==
Adults reach a length of about 2.6 mm. They have a black body. The pronotum has a yellow apical border and anterolateral angle. The elytron is black with three small pale spots.
