= Brachiacantha felina =

Scientific classification
- Kingdom: Animalia
- Phylum: Arthropoda
- Clade: Pancrustacea
- Class: Insecta
- Order: Coleoptera
- Suborder: Polyphaga
- Infraorder: Cucujiformia
- Family: Coccinellidae
- Genus: Brachiacantha
- Species: B. felina

Binomial name
- Brachiacantha felina (Fabricius, 1775)

Synonyms
- Coccinella felina Fabricius, 1775; Brachiacantha fulvopustulata Melsheimer, 1847

Species of beetle

Brachiacantha felina is a species of lady beetle in the family Coccinellidae. It is found in North America, where it has been recorded from Massachusetts to North Carolina, west to Iowa and Louisiana.

== Description ==
Adults reach a length of about 2.20–3 mm. The pronotum of the males is black with a yellow anterior margin and anterolateral angle, while the pronotum of the females is black with a yellow anterolateral angle and sometimes a yellow anterior border. The elytron is black with five yellow spots.
