= Paprzycki =

Paprzycki is a Polish surname. Notable people with the surname include:

- Lech Krzysztof Paprzycki (1947–2022), Polish lawyer and politician
- Oskar Paprzycki (born 1998), Polish footballer
- Barbara Oliwiecka (née Paprzycka; born 1977), Polish politician

== See also ==
- Serratitibia paprzycki, species of beetle
