= Serratitibia kathy =

Scientific classification
- Kingdom: Animalia
- Phylum: Arthropoda
- Clade: Pancrustacea
- Class: Insecta
- Order: Coleoptera
- Suborder: Polyphaga
- Infraorder: Cucujiformia
- Family: Coccinellidae
- Genus: Serratitibia
- Species: S. kathy

Binomial name
- Serratitibia kathy Gordon & Canepari, 2013

Species of beetle

Serratitibia kathy is a species of beetle of the family Coccinellidae. It is found in Bolivia.

== Description ==
Adults reach a length of about 2.6 mm. They have a yellow body, the head with some dark brown areas. About one-fourth of the pronotum is yellow. The elytron is black with seven small yellow spots.
