= Serratitibia cheryl =

Scientific classification
- Kingdom: Animalia
- Phylum: Arthropoda
- Clade: Pancrustacea
- Class: Insecta
- Order: Coleoptera
- Suborder: Polyphaga
- Infraorder: Cucujiformia
- Family: Coccinellidae
- Genus: Serratitibia
- Species: S. cheryl

Binomial name
- Serratitibia cheryl Gordon & Canepari, 2013

Species of beetle

Serratitibia cheryl is a species of beetle of the family Coccinellidae. It is found in Surinam.

== Description ==
Adults reach a length of about 3 mm. They have a yellow body. The pronotum is yellow except for two faint pale brown lines. The elytron is black with five large yellow spots.
