= Serratitibia mildred =

Scientific classification
- Kingdom: Animalia
- Phylum: Arthropoda
- Clade: Pancrustacea
- Class: Insecta
- Order: Coleoptera
- Suborder: Polyphaga
- Infraorder: Cucujiformia
- Family: Coccinellidae
- Genus: Serratitibia
- Species: S. mildred

Binomial name
- Serratitibia mildred Gordon & Canepari, 2013

Species of beetle

Serratitibia mildred is a species of beetle of the family Coccinellidae. It is found in Brazil and Argentina.

== Description ==
Adults reach a length of about 2.7–3.0 mm. They have a yellow body. The elytron is yellow with the sutural margin and five spots brown.
