= Serratitibia kathleen =

Scientific classification
- Kingdom: Animalia
- Phylum: Arthropoda
- Clade: Pancrustacea
- Class: Insecta
- Order: Coleoptera
- Suborder: Polyphaga
- Infraorder: Cucujiformia
- Family: Coccinellidae
- Genus: Serratitibia
- Species: S. kathleen

Binomial name
- Serratitibia kathleen Gordon & Canepari, 2013

Species of beetle

Serratitibia kathleen is a species of beetle of the family Coccinellidae. It is found in Venezuela and Trinidad.

== Description ==
Adults reach a length of about 2.4–3.0 mm. They have a yellow body. The pronotum has one brown spot, a faint trace of another brown spot and two eyebrow spots on each side of the middle. The elytron has six brown spots.
