= Serratitibia rebecca =

Scientific classification
- Kingdom: Animalia
- Phylum: Arthropoda
- Clade: Pancrustacea
- Class: Insecta
- Order: Coleoptera
- Suborder: Polyphaga
- Infraorder: Cucujiformia
- Family: Coccinellidae
- Genus: Serratitibia
- Species: S. rebecca

Binomial name
- Serratitibia rebecca Gordon & Canepari, 2013

Species of beetle

Serratitibia rebecca is a species of beetle of the family Coccinellidae. It is found in Brazil.

== Description ==
Adults reach a length of about 2.5–2.6 mm. They have a yellow body. The pronotum has a brown spot and two pale yellow triangular spots. The elytron is brown with five large yellow spots.
