= Serratitibia anna =

Scientific classification
- Kingdom: Animalia
- Phylum: Arthropoda
- Clade: Pancrustacea
- Class: Insecta
- Order: Coleoptera
- Suborder: Polyphaga
- Infraorder: Cucujiformia
- Family: Coccinellidae
- Genus: Serratitibia
- Species: S. anna

Binomial name
- Serratitibia anna Gordon & Canepari, 2013

Synonyms
- Cleothera arcualis Mulsant, 1853

Species of beetle

Serratitibia anna is a species of beetle of the family Coccinellidae. It is found in Ecuador.

== Description ==
Adults reach a length of about 3.4–3.5 mm. They have a yellow body. The pronotum has a black spot and two brown comma shaped spots. The elytron is black with four large yellow spots.
