= Serratitibia brethesi =

Scientific classification
- Kingdom: Animalia
- Phylum: Arthropoda
- Clade: Pancrustacea
- Class: Insecta
- Order: Coleoptera
- Suborder: Polyphaga
- Infraorder: Cucujiformia
- Family: Coccinellidae
- Genus: Serratitibia
- Species: S. brethesi

Binomial name
- Serratitibia brethesi (Korschefsky, 1931)

Synonyms
- Brachyacantha brethesi Korschefsky, 1931

Species of beetle

Serratitibia brethesi is a species of beetle of the family Coccinellidae. It is found in Brazil.

== Description ==
Adults reach a length of about 3.3 mm. They have a black body and the lateral one-fourth of the pronotum is yellow. The elytron is black with four yellow spots.
