= Serratitibia gaillardi =

Scientific classification
- Kingdom: Animalia
- Phylum: Arthropoda
- Clade: Pancrustacea
- Class: Insecta
- Order: Coleoptera
- Suborder: Polyphaga
- Infraorder: Cucujiformia
- Family: Coccinellidae
- Genus: Serratitibia
- Species: S. gaillardi

Binomial name
- Serratitibia gaillardi (Mulsant, 1853)

Synonyms
- Cleothera gaillardi Mulsant, 1853

Species of beetle

Serratitibia gaillardi is a species of beetle of the family Coccinellidae. It is found in Brazil.

== Description ==
Adults reach a length of about 3.4 mm. They have a yellow body. The pronotum has a brown to dark brown spot. The elytron has brown borders and three dark brown spots.
