= Serratitibia joeli =

Scientific classification
- Kingdom: Animalia
- Phylum: Arthropoda
- Clade: Pancrustacea
- Class: Insecta
- Order: Coleoptera
- Suborder: Polyphaga
- Infraorder: Cucujiformia
- Family: Coccinellidae
- Genus: Serratitibia
- Species: S. joeli

Binomial name
- Serratitibia joeli (Almeida & Milléo, 2000)

Synonyms
- Hinda joeli Almeida & Milléo, 2000

Species of beetle

Serratitibia joeli is a species of beetle of the family Coccinellidae. It is found in Brazil.

== Description ==
Adults reach a length of about 2.7–2.8 mm. They have a yellow body and mostly brown head. The pronotum is black except the lateral one-third, which is yellow. The elytron is brown with two yellow spots.
