= Serratitibia jacqueline =

Scientific classification
- Kingdom: Animalia
- Phylum: Arthropoda
- Clade: Pancrustacea
- Class: Insecta
- Order: Coleoptera
- Suborder: Polyphaga
- Infraorder: Cucujiformia
- Family: Coccinellidae
- Genus: Serratitibia
- Species: S. jacqueline

Binomial name
- Serratitibia jacqueline Gordon & Canepari, 2013

Species of beetle

Serratitibia jacqueline is a species of beetle of the family Coccinellidae. It is found in Ecuador.

== Description ==
Adults reach a length of about 2.6–2.7 mm. They have a yellow body. The pronotum is yellow except for a large black marking. The elytron is yellow with a black border, a small dark brown spot and one very small spot.
