= Serratitibia psylloboroides =

Scientific classification
- Kingdom: Animalia
- Phylum: Arthropoda
- Clade: Pancrustacea
- Class: Insecta
- Order: Coleoptera
- Suborder: Polyphaga
- Infraorder: Cucujiformia
- Family: Coccinellidae
- Genus: Serratitibia
- Species: S. psylloboroides

Binomial name
- Serratitibia psylloboroides (Crotch, 1874)

Synonyms
- Hyperaspis psylloboroides Crotch, 1874

Species of beetle

Serratitibia psylloboroides is a species of beetle of the family Coccinellidae. It is found in Brazil.

== Description ==
Adults reach a length of about 4.5 mm. They have a yellow body. The pronotum has seven dark brown spots. The elytron has four irregular, long brown vittae.
