= Serratitibia regularis =

Scientific classification
- Kingdom: Animalia
- Phylum: Arthropoda
- Clade: Pancrustacea
- Class: Insecta
- Order: Coleoptera
- Suborder: Polyphaga
- Infraorder: Cucujiformia
- Family: Coccinellidae
- Genus: Serratitibia
- Species: S. regularis

Binomial name
- Serratitibia regularis (Erichson, 1847)

Synonyms
- Hinda regularis Erichson, 1847

Species of beetle

Serratitibia regularis is a species of beetle of the family Coccinellidae. It is found in Peru.

== Description ==
Adults reach a length of about 2.5–2.8 mm. They have a yellow body. The pronotum has a black spot. The elytron is black with seven small yellow spots.
