= Serratitibia cynthia =

Scientific classification
- Kingdom: Animalia
- Phylum: Arthropoda
- Clade: Pancrustacea
- Class: Insecta
- Order: Coleoptera
- Suborder: Polyphaga
- Infraorder: Cucujiformia
- Family: Coccinellidae
- Genus: Serratitibia
- Species: S. cynthia

Binomial name
- Serratitibia cynthia Gordon & Canepari, 2013

Species of beetle

Serratitibia cynthia is a species of beetle of the family Coccinellidae. It is found in Brazil.

== Description ==
Adults reach a length of about 2.0–2.6 mm. They have a black body and a yellow head. The pronotum is yellow with a large black spot. The elytron has one small yellow spot and one oval reddish yellow spot.
