= Serratitibia ambigua =

Scientific classification
- Kingdom: Animalia
- Phylum: Arthropoda
- Clade: Pancrustacea
- Class: Insecta
- Order: Coleoptera
- Suborder: Polyphaga
- Infraorder: Cucujiformia
- Family: Coccinellidae
- Genus: Serratitibia
- Species: S. ambigua

Binomial name
- Serratitibia ambigua (Mulsant, 1850)

Synonyms
- Cleothera ambigua Mulsant, 1850

Species of beetle

Serratitibia ambigua is a species of beetle of the Coccinellidae family. It is found in French Guiana and Guyana.

== Description ==
Adults reach a length of about 4.8–5 mm. They have a reddish brown body and yellowish brown head. One-fourth of the pronotum is yellow. The elytron has six small yellow spots.
