= Serratitibia loreto =

Scientific classification
- Kingdom: Animalia
- Phylum: Arthropoda
- Clade: Pancrustacea
- Class: Insecta
- Order: Coleoptera
- Suborder: Polyphaga
- Infraorder: Cucujiformia
- Family: Coccinellidae
- Genus: Serratitibia
- Species: S. loreto

Binomial name
- Serratitibia loreto Gordon & Canepari, 2013

Species of beetle

Serratitibia loreto is a species of beetle of the family Coccinellidae. It is found in Peru and Ecuador.

== Description ==
Adults reach a length of about 1.6 mm. They have a yellow body. The pronotum has a black marking. The elytron is black with four small yellow spots.

== Etymology ==
The species is named for the Department of Loreto in which the type was found.
