= Serratitibia tammy =

Scientific classification
- Kingdom: Animalia
- Phylum: Arthropoda
- Clade: Pancrustacea
- Class: Insecta
- Order: Coleoptera
- Suborder: Polyphaga
- Infraorder: Cucujiformia
- Family: Coccinellidae
- Genus: Serratitibia
- Species: S. tammy

Binomial name
- Serratitibia tammy Gordon & Canepari, 2013

Species of beetle

Serratitibia tammy is a species of beetle of the family Coccinellidae. It is found in Brazil.

== Description ==
Adults reach a length of about 3 mm. They have a yellow body. The pronotum has a large dark brown spot. The elytron has a brown border and two dark brown spots.
