= Serratitibia =

Scientific classification
- Kingdom: Animalia
- Phylum: Arthropoda
- Clade: Pancrustacea
- Class: Insecta
- Order: Coleoptera
- Suborder: Polyphaga
- Infraorder: Cucujiformia
- Family: Coccinellidae
- Subfamily: Coccinellinae
- Tribe: Brachiacanthini
- Genus: Serratitibia; Gordon & Canepari in Gordon et al., 2013

Genus of beetles

Serratitibia is a genus of lady beetles in the family Coccinellidae.

== Species ==
- Section I
  - Serratitibia regularis (Erichson, 1847)
  - Serratitibia donna Gordon & Canepari, 2013
  - Serratitibia lividipes (Mulsant, 1853)
  - Serratitibia ruth Gordon & Canepari, 2013
  - Serratitibia michelle Gordon & Canepari, 2013
  - Serratitibia laura Gordon & Canepari, 2013
  - Serratitibia sarah Gordon & Canepari, 2013
  - Serratitibia melissa Gordon & Canepari, 2013
  - Serratitibia kimberly Gordon & Canepari, 2013
  - Serratitibia traili (Brèthes, 1925)
  - Serratitibia shirley Gordon & Canepari, 2013
  - Serratitibia angela Gordon & Canepari, 2013
  - Serratitibia brenda Gordon & Canepari, 2013
  - Serratitibia bisquatuorpustulata (Mulsant, 1850)
  - Serratitibia arcualis (Mulsant, 1853)
  - Serratitibia anna Gordon & Canepari, 2013
  - Serratitibia rebecca Gordon & Canepari, 2013
  - Serratitibia tortuosa (Mulsant, 1850)
  - Serratitibia gaillardi (Mulsant, 1853)
  - Serratitibia uncinata (Mulsant, 1853)
  - Serratitibia virginia Gordon & Canepari, 2013
  - Serratitibia fraudulenta (Kirsch, 1876)
  - Serratitibia kathleen Gordon & Canepari, 2013
  - Serratitibia rose Gordon & Canepari, 2013
  - Serratitibia janice Gordon & Canepari, 2013
  - Serratitibia decemsignata (Mulsant, 1850)
  - Serratitibia modesta (Weise, 1911)
  - Serratitibia pamela Gordon & Canepari, 2013
  - Serratitibia stephanie Gordon & Canepari, 2013
  - Serratitibia joyce Gordon & Canepari, 2013
  - Serratitibia martha Gordon & Canepari, 2013
  - Serratitibia debra Gordon & Canepari, 2013
  - Serratitibia amanda Gordon & Canepari, 2013
  - Serratitibia christine Gordon & Canepari, 2013
  - Serratitibia janet Gordon & Canepari, 2013
  - Serratitibia bonnie Gordon & Canepari, 2013
  - Serratitibia julie Gordon & Canepari, 2013
  - Serratitibia heather Gordon & Canepari, 2013
  - Serratitibia paprzycki Gordon & Canepari, 2013
  - Serratitibia abendrothi (Kirsch, 1876)
  - Serratitibia quincemil Gordon & Canepari, 2013
  - Serratitibia teresa Gordon & Canepari, 2013
  - Serratitibia doris Gordon & Canepari, 2013
  - Serratitibia katherine Gordon & Canepari, 2013
  - Serratitibia gloria Gordon & Canepari, 2013
  - Serratitibia linda Gordon & Canepari, 2013
  - Serratitibia evelyn Gordon & Canepari, 2013
  - Serratitibia mildred Gordon & Canepari, 2013
  - Serratitibia joan Gordon & Canepari, 2013
  - Serratitibia ashley Gordon & Canepari, 2013
  - Serratitibia judith Gordon & Canepari, 2013
  - Serratitibia terminata (Gorham, 1899)
  - Serratitibia tammy Gordon & Canepari, 2013
  - Serratitibia humerata (Mulsant, 1850)
  - Serratitibia brethesi (Korschefsky, 1931)
  - Serratitibia kathy Gordon & Canepari, 2013
  - Serratitibia irene Gordon & Canepari, 2013
  - Serratitibia judy Gordon & Canepari, 2013
  - Serratitibia kelly Gordon & Canepari, 2013
  - Serratitibia nicole Gordon & Canepari, 2013
- Section II
  - Serratitibia ambigua (Mulsant, 1850)
  - Serratitibia psylloboroides (Crotch, 1874)
  - Serratitibia joeli (Almeida & Milléo, 2000)
  - Serratitibia mary Gordon & Canepari, 2013
  - Serratitibia patricia Gordon & Canepari, 2013
  - Serratitibia cynthia Gordon & Canepari, 2013
  - Serratitibia elizabeth Gordon & Canepari, 2013
  - Serratitibia jennifer Gordon & Canepari, 2013
  - Serratitibia barbara Gordon & Canepari, 2013
  - Serratitibia ruby Gordon & Canepari, 2013
  - Serratitibia helen Gordon & Canepari, 2013
  - Serratitibia susan Gordon & Canepari, 2013
  - Serratitibia margaret Gordon & Canepari, 2013
  - Serratitibia lisa Gordon & Canepari, 2013
  - Serratitibia nancy Gordon & Canepari, 2013
  - Serratitibia loreto Gordon & Canepari, 2013
  - Serratitibia karen Gordon & Canepari, 2013
  - Serratitibia betty Gordon & Canepari, 2013
  - Serratitibia beverly Gordon & Canepari, 2013
  - Serratitibia denise Gordon & Canepari, 2013
  - Serratitibia barclayi Gordon & Canepari, 2013
  - Serratitibia satipoensis Gordon & Canepari, 2013
  - Serratitibia frances Gordon & Canepari, 2013
  - Serratitibia jean Gordon & Canepari, 2013
  - Serratitibia cheryl Gordon & Canepari, 2013
- Section III
  - Serratitibia marilyn Gordon & Canepari, 2013
  - Serratitibia rachel Gordon & Canepari, 2013
  - Serratitibia aliciae (Crotch, 1874)
  - Serratitibia andrea Gordon & Canepari, 2013
  - Serratitibia louise Gordon & Canepari, 2013
  - Serratitibia jacqueline Gordon & Canepari, 2013
  - Serratitibia lori Gordon & Canepari, 2013

== Species incertae sedis ==
- Cleothera propria Kirsch, 1876
- Cleothera secessionis Weise, 1904
- Cleothera trivialis Mulsant, 1853
