= Serratitibia tortuosa =

Scientific classification
- Kingdom: Animalia
- Phylum: Arthropoda
- Clade: Pancrustacea
- Class: Insecta
- Order: Coleoptera
- Suborder: Polyphaga
- Infraorder: Cucujiformia
- Family: Coccinellidae
- Genus: Serratitibia
- Species: S. tortuosa

Binomial name
- Serratitibia tortuosa (Mulsant, 1850)

Synonyms
- Cleothera tortuosa Mulsant, 1850

Species of beetle

Serratitibia tortuosa is a species of beetle of the family Coccinellidae. It is found in Bolivia and Brazil.

== Description ==
Adults reach a length of about 3.8–4.1 mm. They have a yellow body and a reddish brown head. The pronotum has five reddish brown spots. The elytron has four reddish brown vittae.
