= Serratitibia lividipes =

Scientific classification
- Kingdom: Animalia
- Phylum: Arthropoda
- Clade: Pancrustacea
- Class: Insecta
- Order: Coleoptera
- Suborder: Polyphaga
- Infraorder: Cucujiformia
- Family: Coccinellidae
- Genus: Serratitibia
- Species: S. lividipes

Binomial name
- Serratitibia lividipes (Mulsant, 1853)

Synonyms
- Cleothera lividipes Mulsant, 1853

Species of beetle

Serratitibia lividipes is a species of beetle of the family Coccinellidae. It is found in French Guiana and Venezuela.

== Description ==
Adults reach a length of about 2.5–2.6 mm. They have a yellow body. The pronotum has a black spot. The elytron is black with five large yellow spots.
