= Serratitibia uncinata =

Scientific classification
- Kingdom: Animalia
- Phylum: Arthropoda
- Clade: Pancrustacea
- Class: Insecta
- Order: Coleoptera
- Suborder: Polyphaga
- Infraorder: Cucujiformia
- Family: Coccinellidae
- Genus: Serratitibia
- Species: S. uncinata

Binomial name
- Serratitibia uncinata (Mulsant, 1853)

Synonyms
- Cleothera uncinata Mulsant, 1853

Species of beetle

Serratitibia uncinata is a species of beetle of the family Coccinellidae. It is found in Argentina, Brazil and Paraguay.

== Description ==
Adults reach a length of about 2.8 mm. They have a yellow body. The pronotum has a two dark brown spots. The elytron has five dark brown spots.
