= Serratitibia arcualis =

Scientific classification
- Kingdom: Animalia
- Phylum: Arthropoda
- Clade: Pancrustacea
- Class: Insecta
- Order: Coleoptera
- Suborder: Polyphaga
- Infraorder: Cucujiformia
- Family: Coccinellidae
- Genus: Serratitibia
- Species: S. arcualis

Binomial name
- Serratitibia arcualis (Mulsant, 1853)

Synonyms
- Cleothera arcualis Mulsant, 1853

Species of beetle

Serratitibia arcualis is a species of beetle of the family Coccinellidae. It is found in Colombia.

== Description ==
Adults reach a length of about 2.3 mm. They have a yellow body. The pronotum has a small brown spot. The elytron is black with five yellow spots.
