= Serratitibia doris =

Scientific classification
- Kingdom: Animalia
- Phylum: Arthropoda
- Clade: Pancrustacea
- Class: Insecta
- Order: Coleoptera
- Suborder: Polyphaga
- Infraorder: Cucujiformia
- Family: Coccinellidae
- Genus: Serratitibia
- Species: S. doris

Binomial name
- Serratitibia doris Gordon & Canepari, 2013

Species of beetle

Serratitibia doris is a species of beetle of the family Coccinellidae. It is found in Peru.

== Description ==
Adults reach a length of about 2.6 mm. They have a yellow body. The pronotum has a large black spot. The elytron has a dark area widened into a spot and two more brown spots.
