= Serratitibia bisquatuorpustulata =

Scientific classification
- Kingdom: Animalia
- Phylum: Arthropoda
- Clade: Pancrustacea
- Class: Insecta
- Order: Coleoptera
- Suborder: Polyphaga
- Infraorder: Cucujiformia
- Family: Coccinellidae
- Genus: Serratitibia
- Species: S. bisquatuorpustulata

Binomial name
- Serratitibia bisquatuorpustulata (Mulsant, 1850)

Synonyms
- Cleothera bis-quatuorpustulata Mulsant, 1850; Hyperaspis bis-quatuor-pustulata; Hyperaspis jocosa ab. bisquatuorpustulata

Species of beetle

Serratitibia bisquatuorpustulata is a species of beetle of the family Coccinellidae. It is found in Colombia and Ecuador.

== Description ==
Adults reach a length of about 2.0–2.4 mm. They have a yellow body. The pronotum has a small brown spot. The elytron is black with four yellow spots.
