= Serratitibia kelly =

Scientific classification
- Kingdom: Animalia
- Phylum: Arthropoda
- Clade: Pancrustacea
- Class: Insecta
- Order: Coleoptera
- Suborder: Polyphaga
- Infraorder: Cucujiformia
- Family: Coccinellidae
- Genus: Serratitibia
- Species: S. kelly

Binomial name
- Serratitibia kelly Gordon & Canepari, 2013

Species of beetle

Serratitibia kelly is a species of beetle of the family Coccinellidae. It is found in Colombia.

== Description ==
Adults reach a length of about 2.7 mm. They have a black body, with the head reddish brown above the base of the antennae. About one-third of the pronotum is yellow. The elytron has one large yellow oval spot.
