= Serratitibia joan =

Scientific classification
- Kingdom: Animalia
- Phylum: Arthropoda
- Clade: Pancrustacea
- Class: Insecta
- Order: Coleoptera
- Suborder: Polyphaga
- Infraorder: Cucujiformia
- Family: Coccinellidae
- Genus: Serratitibia
- Species: S. joan

Binomial name
- Serratitibia joan Gordon & Canepari, 2013

Species of beetle

Serratitibia joan is a species of beetle of the family Coccinellidae. It is found in Ecuador and Colombia.

== Description ==
Adults reach a length of about 2.4–3.0 mm. They have a yellow body. The pronotum is yellow except for a large black spot. The elytron is yellow with a black border and two small dark brown spots.
