= Serratitibia decemsignata =

Scientific classification
- Kingdom: Animalia
- Phylum: Arthropoda
- Clade: Pancrustacea
- Class: Insecta
- Order: Coleoptera
- Suborder: Polyphaga
- Infraorder: Cucujiformia
- Family: Coccinellidae
- Genus: Serratitibia
- Species: S. decemsignata

Binomial name
- Serratitibia decemsignata (Mulsant, 1850)

Synonyms
- Cleothera decem-signata Mulsant, 1850

Species of beetle

Serratitibia decemsignata is a species of beetle of the family Coccinellidae. It is found in French Guiana.

== Description ==
Adults reach a length of about 2.5–2.8 mm. They have a yellow body. The pronotum has a small black spot. The elytron is black with five large yellow spots.
