= Serratitibia martha =

Scientific classification
- Kingdom: Animalia
- Phylum: Arthropoda
- Clade: Pancrustacea
- Class: Insecta
- Order: Coleoptera
- Suborder: Polyphaga
- Infraorder: Cucujiformia
- Family: Coccinellidae
- Genus: Serratitibia
- Species: S. martha

Binomial name
- Serratitibia martha Gordon & Canepari, 2013

Species of beetle

Serratitibia martha is a species of beetle of the family Coccinellidae. It is found in Bolivia.

== Description ==
Adults reach a length of about 2.3–2.8 mm. They have a yellow body. The pronotum has a black spot. The elytron is black with five yellow spots.
