= Serratitibia katherine =

Scientific classification
- Kingdom: Animalia
- Phylum: Arthropoda
- Clade: Pancrustacea
- Class: Insecta
- Order: Coleoptera
- Suborder: Polyphaga
- Infraorder: Cucujiformia
- Family: Coccinellidae
- Genus: Serratitibia
- Species: S. katherine

Binomial name
- Serratitibia katherine Gordon & Canepari, 2013

Species of beetle

Serratitibia katherine is a species of beetle of the family Coccinellidae. It is found in Peru.

== Description ==
Adults reach a length of about 2.8–3 mm. They have a yellow body. The pronotum is yellow except for black spot. The elytron has four small black spots.
