= Serratitibia fraudulenta =

Scientific classification
- Kingdom: Animalia
- Phylum: Arthropoda
- Clade: Pancrustacea
- Class: Insecta
- Order: Coleoptera
- Suborder: Polyphaga
- Infraorder: Cucujiformia
- Family: Coccinellidae
- Genus: Serratitibia
- Species: S. fraudulenta

Binomial name
- Serratitibia fraudulenta (Kirsch, 1876)

Synonyms
- Hyperaspis ecoffeti var. fraudulenta Kirsch, 1876

Species of beetle

Serratitibia fraudulenta is a species of beetle of the family Coccinellidae. It is found in Bolivia, Brazil, Ecuador, Peru and Venezuela.

== Description ==
Adults reach a length of about 1.6–2.0 mm. They have a yellow body. The pronotum has a large oval black spot. The elytron has a black border and two large black spots.
