= Serratitibia traili =

Scientific classification
- Kingdom: Animalia
- Phylum: Arthropoda
- Clade: Pancrustacea
- Class: Insecta
- Order: Coleoptera
- Suborder: Polyphaga
- Infraorder: Cucujiformia
- Family: Coccinellidae
- Genus: Serratitibia
- Species: S. traili

Binomial name
- Serratitibia traili (Brèthes, 1925)

Synonyms
- Cleothera traili Brèthes, 1925

Species of beetle

Serratitibia traili is a species of beetle of the family Coccinellidae. It is found in Brazil.

== Description ==
Adults reach a length of about 2.5 mm. They have a yellow body. The elytron is black with four small yellow spots.
