= Serratitibia abendrothi =

Scientific classification
- Kingdom: Animalia
- Phylum: Arthropoda
- Clade: Pancrustacea
- Class: Insecta
- Order: Coleoptera
- Suborder: Polyphaga
- Infraorder: Cucujiformia
- Family: Coccinellidae
- Genus: Serratitibia
- Species: S. abendrothi

Binomial name
- Serratitibia abendrothi (Kirsch, 1876)

Synonyms
- Cleothera abendrothi Kirsch, 1876

Species of beetle

Serratitibia abendrothi is a species of beetle of the Coccinellidae family. It is found in Peru.

== Description ==
Adults reach a length of about 2.7–3 mm. They have a yellow body. The pronotum has a small black spot. The elytron is black with five large yellow spots.
