= Serratitibia terminata =

Scientific classification
- Kingdom: Animalia
- Phylum: Arthropoda
- Clade: Pancrustacea
- Class: Insecta
- Order: Coleoptera
- Suborder: Polyphaga
- Infraorder: Cucujiformia
- Family: Coccinellidae
- Genus: Serratitibia
- Species: S. terminata

Binomial name
- Serratitibia terminata (Gorham, 1894)

Synonyms
- Hyperaspis terminata Gorham, 1894

Species of beetle

Serratitibia terminata is a species of beetle of the family Coccinellidae. It is found in Brazil and Panama.

== Description ==
Adults reach a length of about 2.4–2.7 mm. They have a yellow body. The pronotum has a large black spot. The apical one-fifth of the elytron is dark brown.
