= Serratitibia paprzycki =

Scientific classification
- Kingdom: Animalia
- Phylum: Arthropoda
- Clade: Pancrustacea
- Class: Insecta
- Order: Coleoptera
- Suborder: Polyphaga
- Infraorder: Cucujiformia
- Family: Coccinellidae
- Genus: Serratitibia
- Species: S. paprzycki

Binomial name
- Serratitibia paprzycki Gordon & Canepari, 2013

Species of beetle

Serratitibia paprzycki is a species of beetle of the family Coccinellidae. It is found in Peru.

== Description ==
Adults reach a length of about 2.4–2.7 mm. They have a yellow body. The pronotum has a small black spot and a small dark yellow triangular spot on each side of the disc. The elytron is black with five large yellow spots.

== Etymology ==
This species is named in honour of the collector of the species.
