= Whitmire =

Whitmire can refer to:

== People ==
- Bill Whitmire (born 1948), American politician
- Chris Whitmire (born 1968), American politician
- Don Whitmire (1922–1991), American football player
- Emily Whitmire (born 1991), American mixed martial artist
- John Whitmire (born 1949), American attorney and politician
- Kathy Whitmire (born 1946), American politician and accountant
- Sandra Smith Whitmire (born 1980), American TV journalist
- Stan Whitmire (born 1963), American pianist
- Steve Whitmire (born 1959), American puppeteer

== Places ==
- Whitmire, South Carolina, a town in Newberry County, South Carolina, US
- Whitmire Creek (Animas Mountains), a tributary to Animas Creek, Hidalgo County, New Mexico, US
- Whitmire Creek (Peloncillo Mountains), a tributary to Animas Creek, Hidalgo County, New Mexico, US
  - Whitmire Canyon, the source of Whitmire Creek
- Whitmire Pass, a gap in the Animas Mountains, Hidalgo County, New Mexico, US
- Whitmire Ranch, a locale in Hidalgo County, New Mexico, US
- Whitmire Spring, a spring in Hidalgo County, New Mexico, US

== See also ==
- Bob Waters Field at E. J. Whitmire Stadium, a football stadium in Cullowhee, North Carolina, US
- Newberry, Whitmire and Augusta Railroad, a South Carolina railroad company
