= Whitmire Pass =

Gap in the Animas Mountains, Hidalgo County, New Mexico

Coordinates: 31°47′59″N 108°42′05″W

Whitmire Pass is a gap in the Animas Mountains in Hidalgo County, New Mexico. It lies at an elevation of 4,977 feet (1,517 meters). The pass was named after J. B. Whitmire, a rancher in the 1880s, owner of the Whitmire Ranch that lies to the east of the pass, on the west shore of Playas Lake, nearby Whitmire Spring. Whitmire Creek flows from the west slope of the pass, into Animas Creek in the Animas Valley. Another, unnamed arroyo runs eastward down into the Playas Valley, toward Playas Lake at Whitmire Spring.

== History ==
Whitmire Pass was the pass used by the expedition of Lt. Col. Philip St. George Cooke and the Mormon Battalion to cross the Animas Mountains into the Animas Valley from Whitmire Springs, on November 25, 1846. The expedition's route became known as Cooke's Wagon Road, and was part of the southern route of the 49ers to California during the California Gold Rush.

After the early 1850s this part of Cooke's route was replaced by the shorter Tucson Cutoff, to the north, as the main route of east–west travel. Toward the end of the Apache Wars, during the 1880s, J. B. Whitmire was the first settler at the springs and made them the site of his ranch house until he sold out.
