= Malpai Borderlands =

Region along the US–Mexico border

Coordinates: 31°31′25″N 108°52′27″W

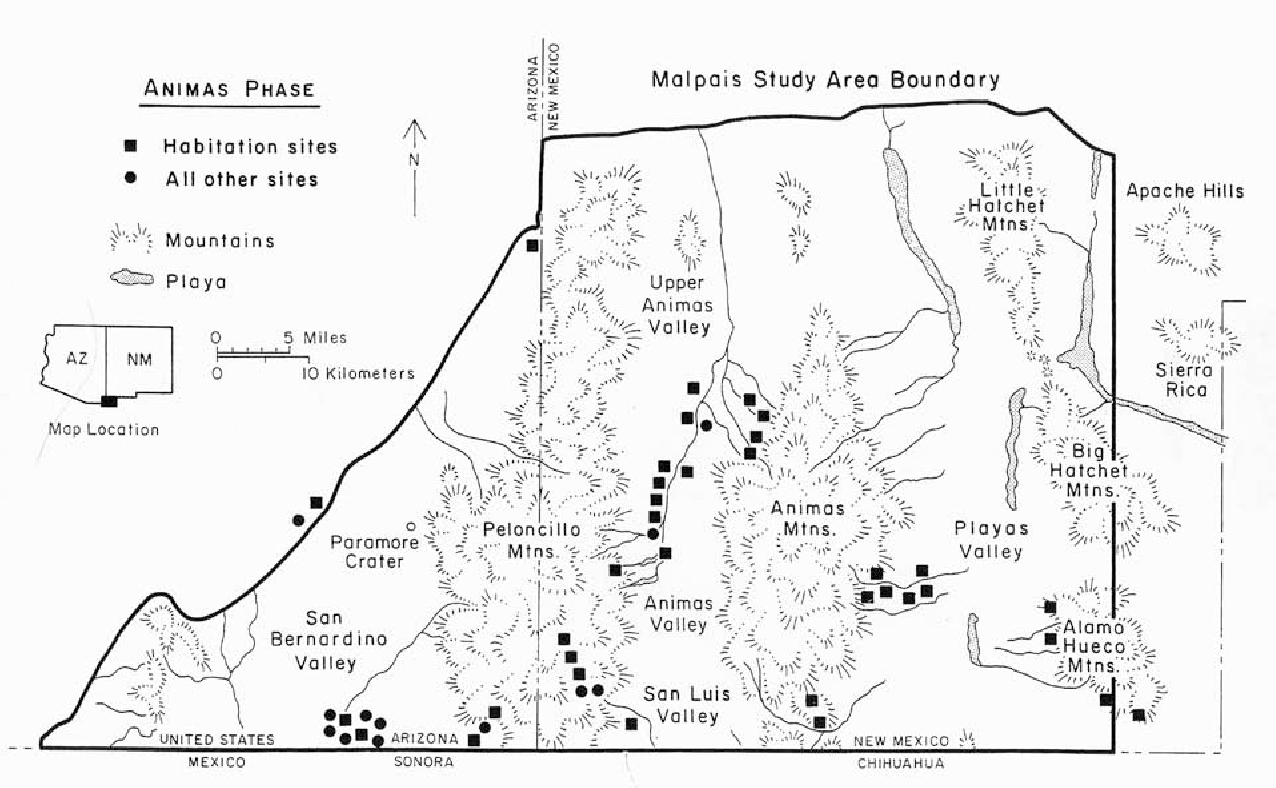
The boundaries of the Malpai or Malpais borderlands are indefinite. This map shows the region as defined by prehistoric cultures.

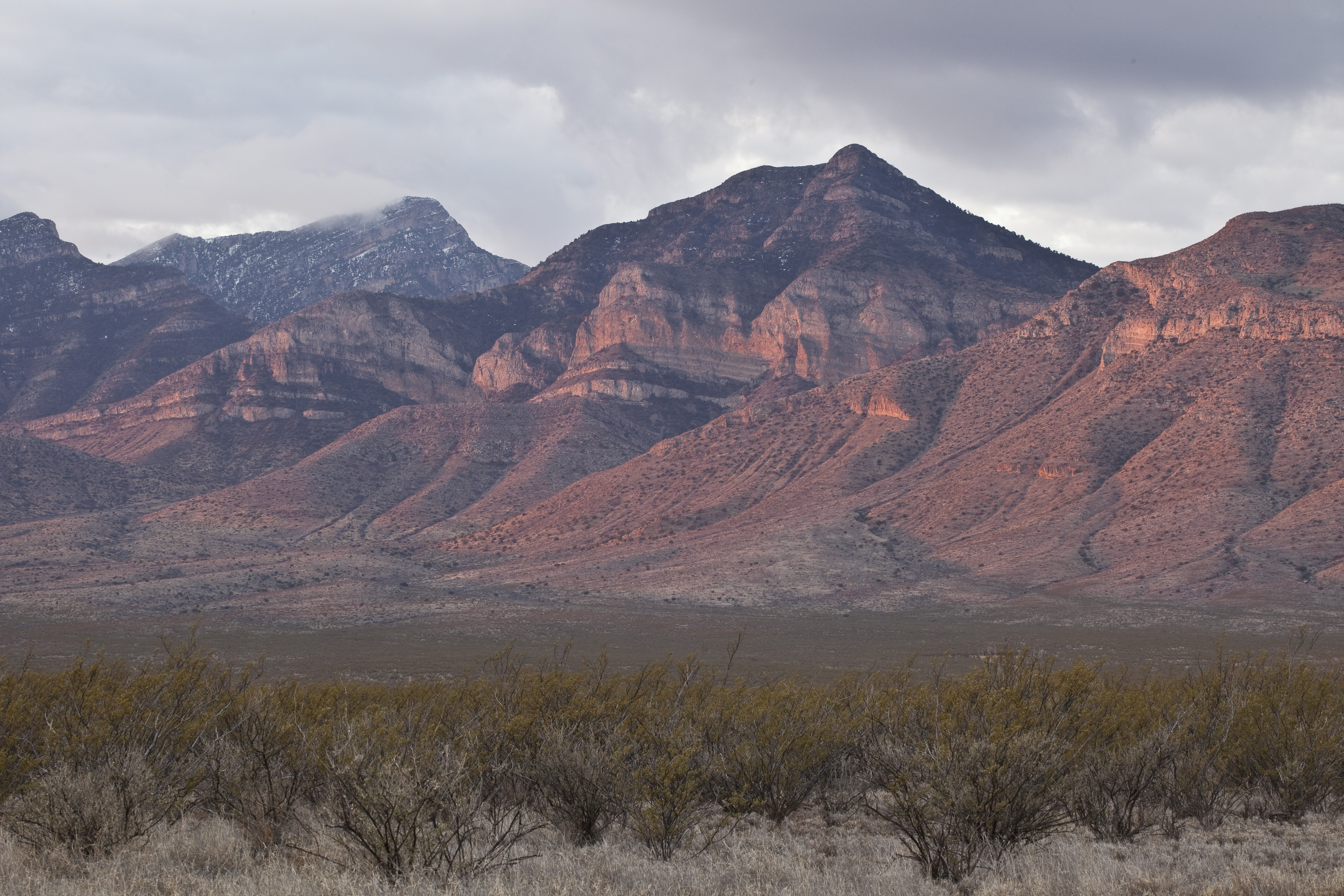
The Big Hatchet Mountains in New Mexico rise to 8,356 ft (2,547 m).

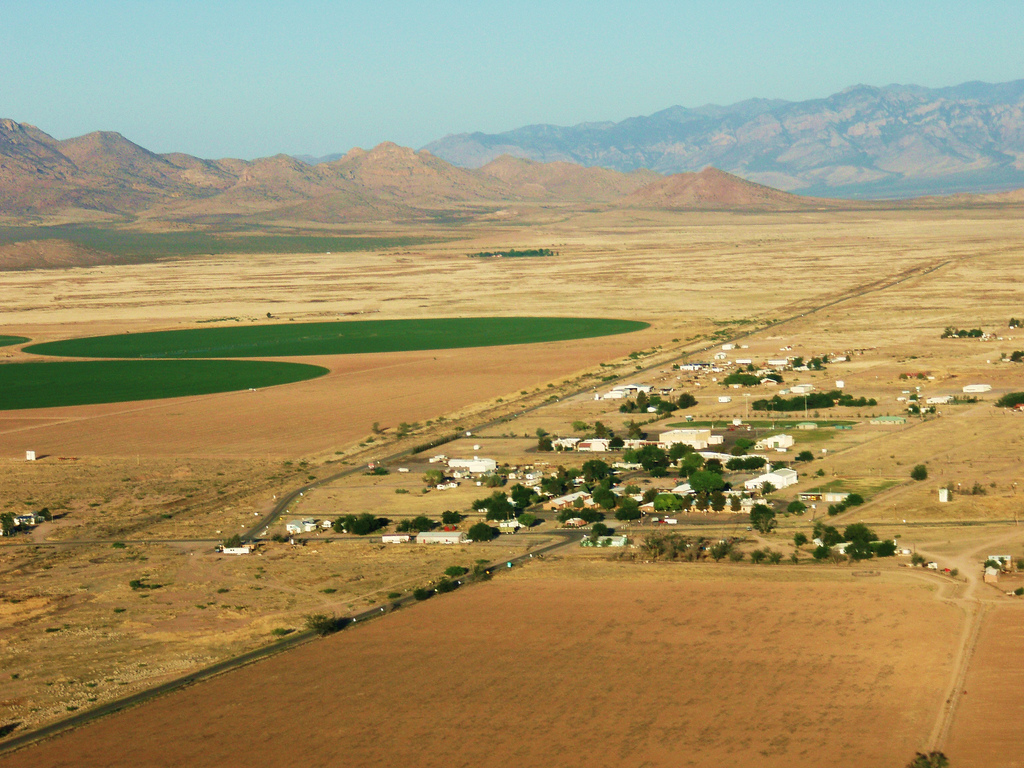
The community of Animas, New Mexico is on the northern edge of the Malpai Borderlands.

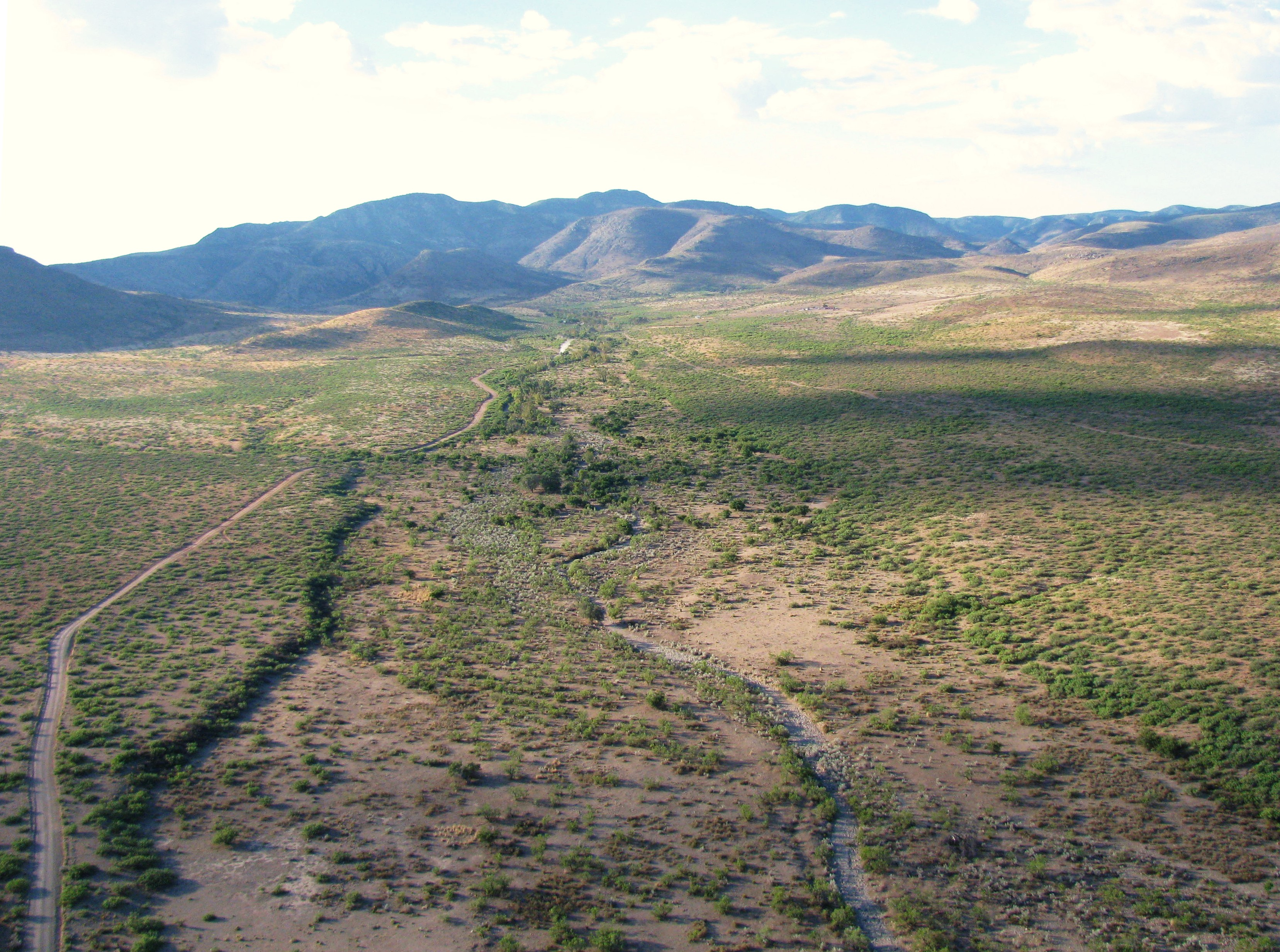
Skeleton Canyon and the Peloncillo Mountains in Arizona. Geronimo surrendered here in 1886.

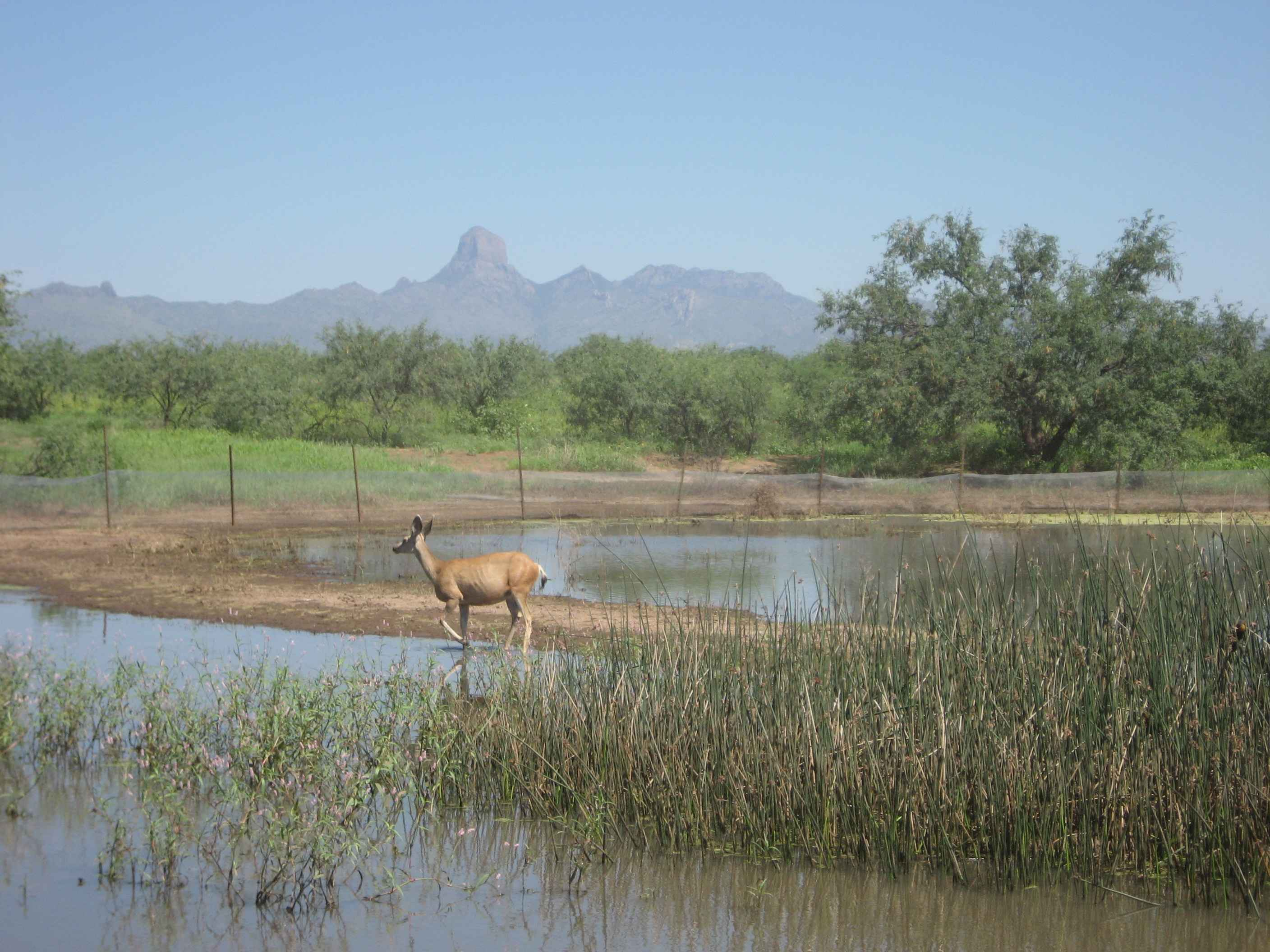
San Bernardino National Wildlife Refuge features wetlands.

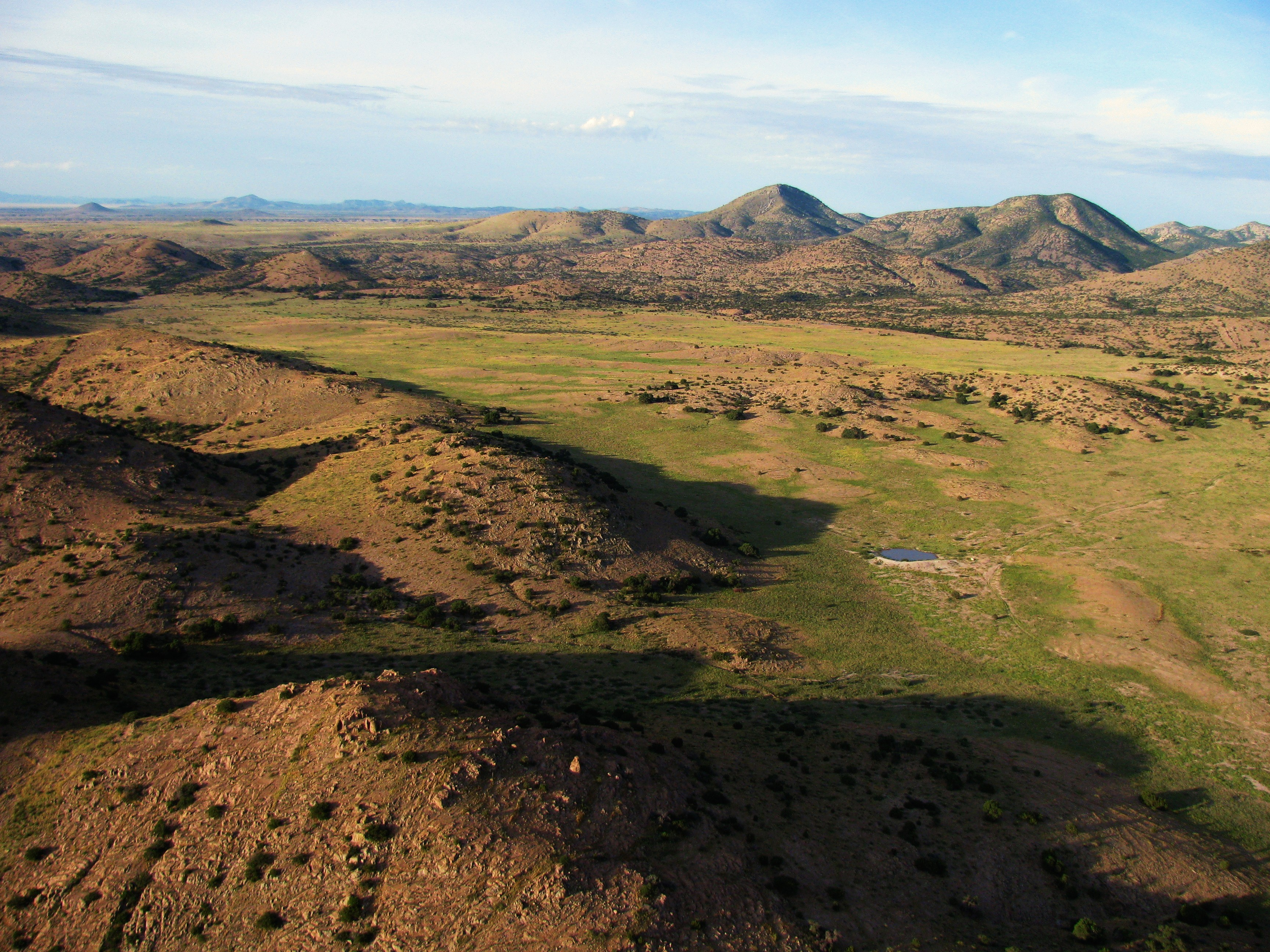
A panorama of the upper Animas Valley.

Malpai Borderlands is a land area along the U.S.-Mexico border. It encompasses the southeast corner of Arizona and the southwest corner of New Mexico. It is sometimes defined as including areas in the Mexican states of Chihuahua and Sonora. The Malpai is part of the Madrean Region which includes the arid and semi-arid borderlands of the United States and Mexico from California to Texas.

The Malpai consists of steep, narrow mountain ranges separated by grassy, semi-arid plains. The lowest elevations are about 3,700 feet in the San Bernardino National Wildlife Refuge. The highest elevation is 8,565 ft (2,611 m) above mean sea level (AMSL) in the Animas Mountains. Mountain ranges run north-south. Vegetation is desert shrub and grassland at lower elevations, transitioning to pinon-juniper and oak-pine woodlands, with coniferous forests at the highest elevations. Cattle ranching is the main economic activity.

In the 1990s, ranchers in the Malpai formed the Malpai Borderlands Group devoted to the preservation of privately owned ranches combined with practices to improve and manage the land in an environmentally-sensitive manner. Much of the land is protected from development and subdivision by conservation easements.

== Etymology ==
Malpai is an Americanization of the Spanish word malpaís, which can be translated as bad lands. The word is sometimes spelled Malapai.

== Geography ==
=== Location and acreage ===
The boundaries of the Malpai Borderlands are indefinite. Located in southwestern New Mexico and southeastern Arizona, one definition of the Malpai is that it borders Mexico for approximately 75 miles (121 km) and extends northward from the border for up to 50 miles (80 km). The area is 2,700 sq mi (7,000 km^{2}) of which about 2,000 sq mi (5,200 km^{2}) is in Hidalgo and Grant counties, New Mexico and 700 sq mi (1,800 km^{2}) is in Cochise County, Arizona. The Malpai Borderlands share the geography of neighboring Mexico, including the Janos Biosphere Reserve, a 2,000 sq mi (5,200 km^{2}) conservation region bordering the New Mexican portion of the Malpai.

Within the larger area the Malpai Borderlands Group of ranchers is devoted to environmentally-sensitive ranching and preservation of the traditional use of the land for cattle ranching. The lands within the borders defined by members of the group total 800,000 acres (320,000 ha) (1,250 sq miles) of which 53 percent of the land is privately owned and 47 percent is publicly owned by the states of New Mexico and Arizona and the U.S. Forest Service and the Bureau of Land Management. Fewer than 100 families reside on these lands.

Also within the Malpai Borderlands is the San Bernardino National Wildlife Refuge in Arizona, consisting of 2,309 acres (934 ha).

=== Terrain, flora, and fauna ===
The terrain of the Malpai Borderlands consist of a series of north-south rending mountain ranges separated by broad, mostly flat valleys. The eastern border of the Malpai consists of the Little Hatchet, Big Hatchet and Alamo Hueco ranges. The Playas Valley is west of these ranges followed by the Animas Mountains, the Animas and San Luis Valleys, the Peloncillo Mountains, and the San Bernardino Valley. The Padilla Mountains form the western boundary of the Malpai. Elevations of the valleys range from about 3,700 ft (1,100 m) to 5,200 ft (1,600 m). The highest mountain in the region is Animas Peak with an elevation of 8,565 ft (2,611 m). The mountain ranges are called sky islands as they rise steeply above the desert valleys. The Sky Islands have cooler temperatures, receive greater precipitation, and have more diverse and abundant vegetation than the valleys.

Grassland and shrub land make up 87.9 percent of the vegetation in the Madrean region mostly in the valleys and lower elevations of the mountains. At higher elevations, are piñon, juniper, and Madrean oak woodlands. The highest elevations of the Animas mountains are cloaked with coniferous forests. Cottonwoods and sycamores grow near watercourses and springs. The total number of plant species within the region is estimated at 4,000.

The Malpai Borderlands are an area of high diversity. An estimated "104 species of mammal, 327 species of birds, 136 species of reptiles and amphibians, and the greatest known richness of bee species in the world" inhabit the Malpai.

=== Climate ===
The climate of Animas, New Mexico on the northern edge of the Malpai Borderlands at an elevation of about 4,500 ft (1,400 m) is borderline BW (arid desert) and BS (semi-arid steppe) in the Köppen Classification system. Average monthly temperatures for Animas range from 44 °F (7 °C) in January to 80 °F (27 °C) in July. Annual precipitation averages 11.67 in (296 mm). In what is called the North American Monsoon, most precipitation is received July thru September. Annual snowfall totals an average of 5 in (130 mm). Precipitation, however, is highly variable from year to year with drought common.

The mountain ranges rising above the semi-desert lowlands have greater precipitation and lower average temperatures. Average temperatures decline about 3.6°F (2.2°C) and precipitation increases by 3.9 in (99 mm) to 4.9 in (120 mm) with each 1,000 ft (300 m) increase in elevation. Thus, the climate of the higher mountains is substantially different than that of the lowlands with average annual precipitation reaching perhaps 20 in (510 mm). Changes in elevation result in more abundant and different characteristics of flora and fauna.

== Malpai Borderlands Group ==
In 1990 the Nature Conservancy purchased the Gray Ranch, with an area of 502 sq mi (1,300 km^{2}) from a Mexican owner. The Animas Mountains were within the boundaries of the ranch. The Nature Conservancy began negotiations with the U.S. Fish and Wildlife Service to turn the ranch into a wildlife refuge and exclude cattle grazing, the principal economic activity of the ranch.

Local ranchers lobbied against the sale of the ranch to the U.S. government. The ranchers saw the proposed transfer of the land to the government as part of a movement to prevent cattle grazing on public lands. Secretary of the Interior Manuel Lujan sided with the ranchers. As a result in 1993, the Nature Conservancy sold the ranch to the newly created Animas Foundation. The conditions of the sale prohibited the Foundation from developing the land but permitted continued cattle grazing. The name of the Gray Ranch was changed to the Diamond A.

In the midst of the controversy surrounding the Gray Ranch, a group of local ranchers banded together to form the Malpai Borderlands Group. The goal of the Group was to preserve the land in the Malpai region from fragmentation, i.e. the division of large ranches into small "ranchettes" as is common in the American West, and to manage the land in a way that benefited both ranchers and plant and animal life. The Malpai Borderlands Group included scientists and environmentalists among its members.

By 2021, the accomplishments of the Malpai Borderlands group included agreements with fifteen ranchers for conservation easements on 280,000 acres (110,000 ha) of land in addition to the conservation easement on the Gray ranch of 320,000 acres (130,000 ha). The easements protect the land from subdivision and development.

== See also ==
- Madrean sky islands (article with map of area)
- Janos Biosphere Reserve

== Sources ==
- "Toward Integrated Research, Land Management, and Ecosystem Protection in the Malpai Borderlands: Conference Summary," Rocky Mountain Research Station Report P-10, US Forest Service, July 1999.
- US Geological Survey web page on region
