= Zeller Peak =

Mountain in New Mexico, United States

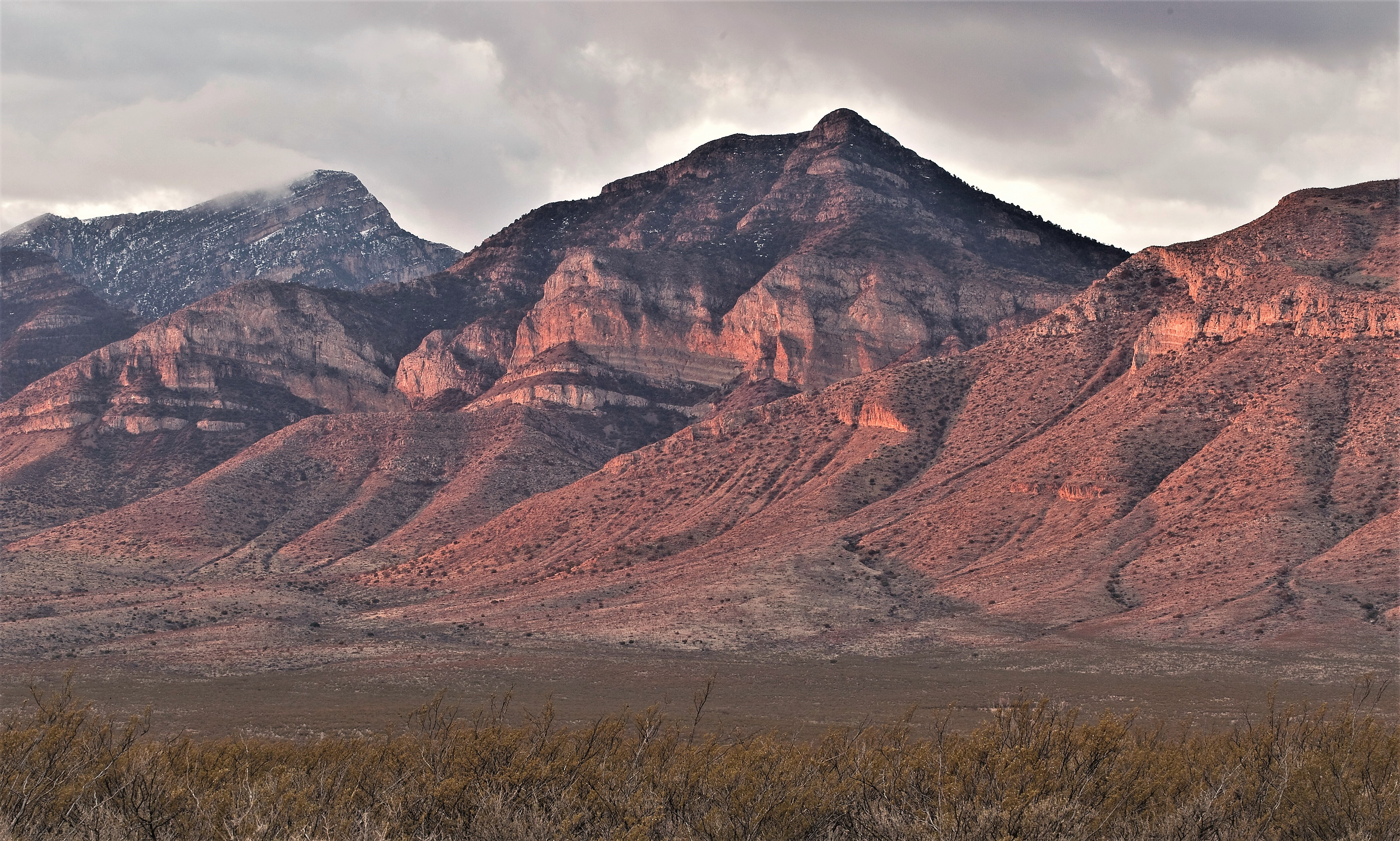
- North aspect, centered (Big Hatchet Peak to the left)

Highest point
- Elevation: 7,426 ft (2,263 m)
- Prominence: 746 ft (227 m)
- Parent peak: Big Hatchet Peak (8,359 ft)
- Isolation: 1.91 mi (3.07 km)
- Coordinates: 31°39′47″N 108°23′49″W

Naming
- Etymology: Robert Allen Zeller

Geography
- Location within New Mexico Location within the United States
- Location: Big Hatchet Mountains Wilderness Study Area
- Country: United States of America
- State: New Mexico
- County: Hidalgo
- Parent range: Big Hatchet Mountains
- Topo map: USGS Big Hatchet Peak

Geology
- Rock age: Paleozoic
- Mountain type: Fault block
- Rock type: Limestone

Zeller Peak is a 7,426-foot elevation (2,263 m) mountain summit located in Hidalgo County, New Mexico, United States.

== Description ==
Zeller Peak is located at the northern end of the Big Hatchet Mountains which are set in the New Mexico Bootheel. It is set within the Big Hatchet Mountains Wilderness Study Area, on land managed by the Bureau of Land Management. The remote mountain is situated 70 miles southwest of the town of Deming, two miles north of Big Hatchet Peak, and can be seen from Highway 81. Topographic relief is significant as the summit rises 2,400 feet (730 meters) above the Playas Valley in one mile, and 2,000 feet (610 meters) above the Hachita Valley in one-half mile.

== Etymology ==
This landform's toponym was officially adopted by the United States Board on Geographic Names in 1979 to honor Dr. Robert A. Zeller Jr. (1921–1970). Zeller was a geologist and naturalist who spent more than 10 years studying the geology of the Big Hatchet Mountains, and wrote his Ph.D. dissertation about these mountains. Following his death in an airplane crash in Arizona, he was remembered as one of the most able geologists to ever live and work in the state of New Mexico.

== Gallery ==
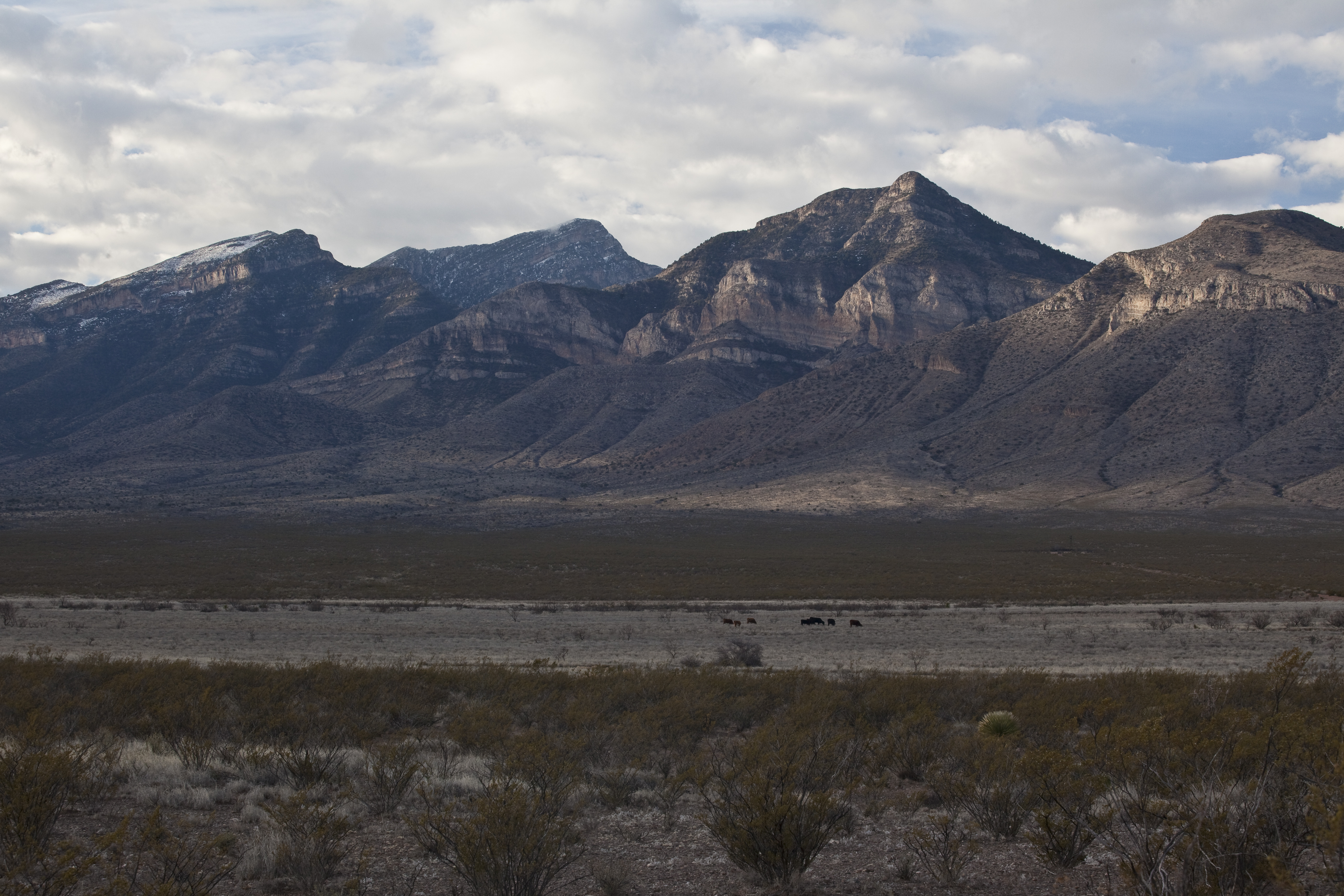
Zeller Peak (right of center) and Big Hatchet Peak in back to left

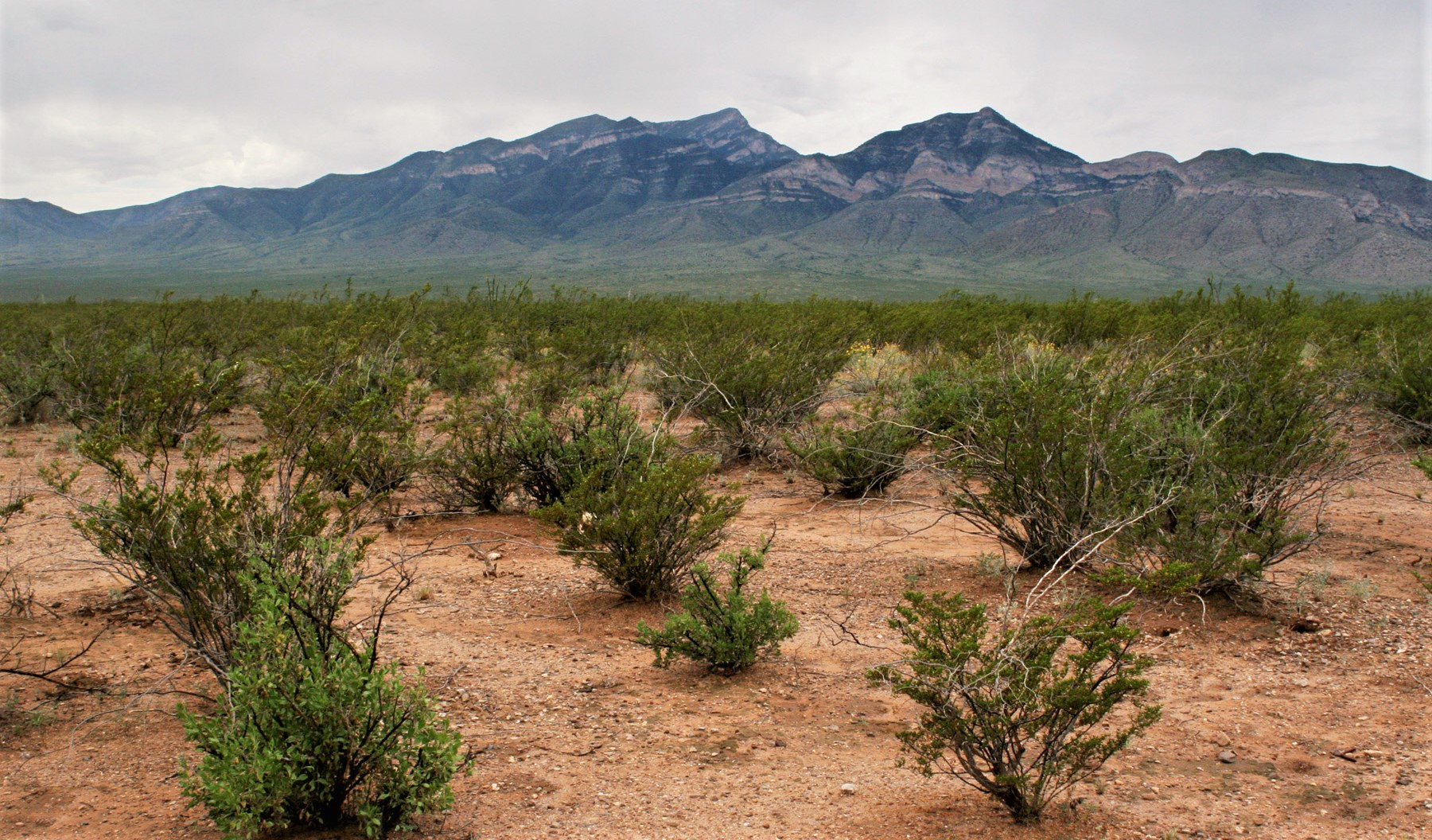
Zeller Peak to the right

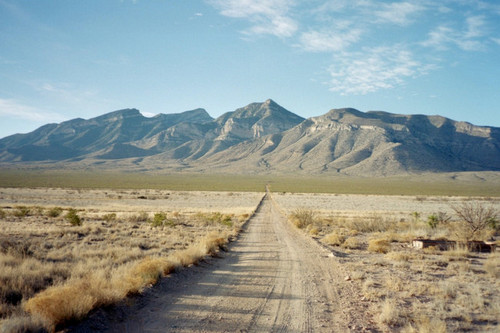
Road is pointed at Zeller Peak

== See also ==
- List of mountain peaks of New Mexico
