= Gillespie Creek (New Mexico) =

Gillespie Creek is an intermittent stream or arroyo in Hidalgo County, New Mexico. Gillespie Creek is 11 miles (18 km) long, heading in the Animas Mountains at 31°37′10″N 108°42′40″W and flowing northeasterly until it ends in the Playas Valley, at an elevation of 4,587 feet (1,398 meters). Its waters in flood would reach Playas Lake. Its mouth is located 24 miles south southeast of Animas. Bennett Creek is a tributary that has its confluence with Gillespie Creek at 31°38′56″N 108°37′23″W an elevation of 4,902 feet (1,494 meters).
