= Cowboy Rim =

Cliff in Hidalgo County, New Mexico, US

Cowboy Rim is a cliff that runs along the Continental Divide in the Animas Mountains of Hidalgo County, New Mexico. It runs west from a point at 31°36′34″N 108°41′37″W to its highpoint is at an elevation of 6,591 feet (2,009 meters) at 31°36′36″N 108°39′31″W just east of Elephant Butte. Here Cowboy Rim overlooks the Gillespie Creek valley below it to the north, and the Continental Divide runs along this section of the rim, then turns of to the south-southwest from the highpoint, along a ridge west of Elephant Butte Canyon. Cowboy Rim continues eastward to Elephant Butte then turns south-southeastward to 31°32′52″N 108°37′22″W. This section of the Rim overlooks the Playas Valley below it to the east.
