= Big Burro Mountains =

Mountain range in Grant County, New Mexico

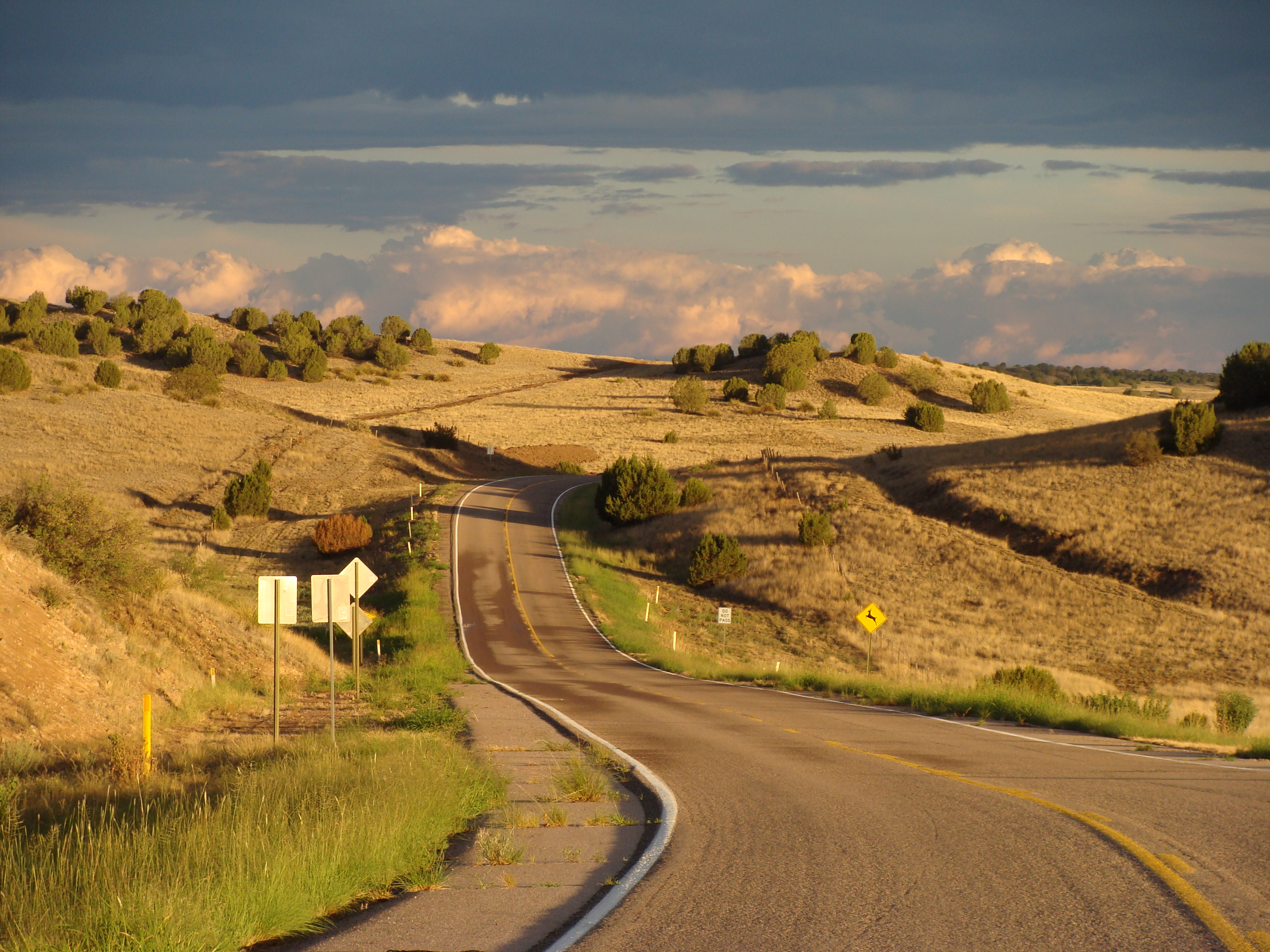
- Foothills at northeast Big Burro Mtns (north Little Burro Mountains, US Route 180 in New Mexico)

Highest point
- Peak: Burro Peak
- Elevation: 8,035 ft (2,449 m)
- Coordinates: 32°35′26″N 108°25′58″W

Dimensions
- Length: 35 mi (56 km) NW-SE
- Width: 15 mi (24 km)

Geography
- Location within New Mexico
- Country: United States
- State: New Mexico
- Regions: Chihuahuan Desert and Continental Divide of the Americas
- County: Grant
- River: Gila River
- Communities: Cliff, Gila, Silver City, White Signal and Red Rock
- Range coordinates: 32°42′32″N 108°32′17″W
- Borders on: Lordsburg Mesa, Animas Valley, Silver City, Silver City Range and Little Burro Mountains

The Big Burro Mountains are a moderate length 35-mile (56 km) long, mountain range located in central Grant County, New Mexico. The range's northwest–southeast 'ridgeline' is located 15 mi southwest of Silver City.

The southeast end of the range has the Continental Divide of the Americas crossing the range over Burro Peak and traversing from Silver City, the Pinos Altos Range, and then the adjacent Little Burro Mountains attached to the Big Burro's on the southeast.

The northwest region of the range has the Gila River traversing on a course from the Gila Wilderness, north of Silver City, and the Gila on its excursion towards Arizona, being one of the major regional river basins of the arid Sonoran Desert of central and southern Arizona. On the other hand, the Big Burro Mountains are on the northwest perimeter of the Chihuahuan Desert as it extends into southern New Mexico through the Playas and Animas Valleys.

== Description ==
The Big Burro Mountains are 35 mi long with various widths up to 12–18 mi. The range is in a transitional point between the Gila Wilderness area north of Silver City, and the northern headlands of the two north–south valleys to the southwest, the Animas and Playas Valleys.

The adjacent region northwest at the Arizona border is the White Mountains and Mogollon Rim region, and the east of the Arizona transition zone-(Arizona Highlands); the transition zone effectively continues into western New Mexico, and has an eastern perimeter as it borders the western and southwestern area of the Plains of San Agustin, about 70 mi north of the Big Burro Mountains. Many mountain ranges in this region are not easily defined with mountain range perimeters.

=== Peaks ===
The highest peak in the Big Burro Mountains is Burro Peak, at 8,035 feet (2,449 m). It is located at 32.590635°N 108.432827°W. Bullard Peak, 7,064 feet (2,153 m), is the approximate center of the range.

=== Access ===
The Big Burro Mountains have easy access being surrounded by various population centers: Cliff–Gila at the north; Red Rock at the west; Silver City–Tyrone at the east; and White Signal at the southeast.

== Continental Divide ==
The Continental Divide starts to leave the forested mountain regions as it goes southwest from Silver City. It passes from the southern Little Burro Mountains, crosses the Big Burro's, then on a circuitous route after skirting the northeast region of the Cedar Mountain Range, it passes across the water divide of the north Playas Valley, west of Hachita. It finally enters a series of north–south ranges, including the Pyramid and Animas Mountains, and traverses south into northwest Chihuahua, Mexico.

== Geology ==
The Big Burro Mountains are part of the Mazatzal province, a block of the Earth's crust that began as an island arc and collided and merged with North America around 1650 million years ago. Great bodies of magma were intruded into the older rock around 1460 million years ago and cooled underground to form granitic batholiths, including the Burro Mountain granite. A smaller intrusion was emplaced around 1225 million years ago as the Redrock granite.

Younger sediments were deposited on top of this rock, but were mostly eroded away when faulting associated with the Laramide orogeny uplifted a large block of crust to form the Big Burro Mountains.

An intrusion sometime during the Tertiary emplaced a laccolith with an associated copper ore body that was mined at the Tyrone mine. Deposits of turquoise in the mountains were mined by Native Americans, but most archeological evidence of the pre-European workings was destroyed by subsequent copper mining.
