= Alamo Hueco Mountains =

Mountain range in New Mexico, United States

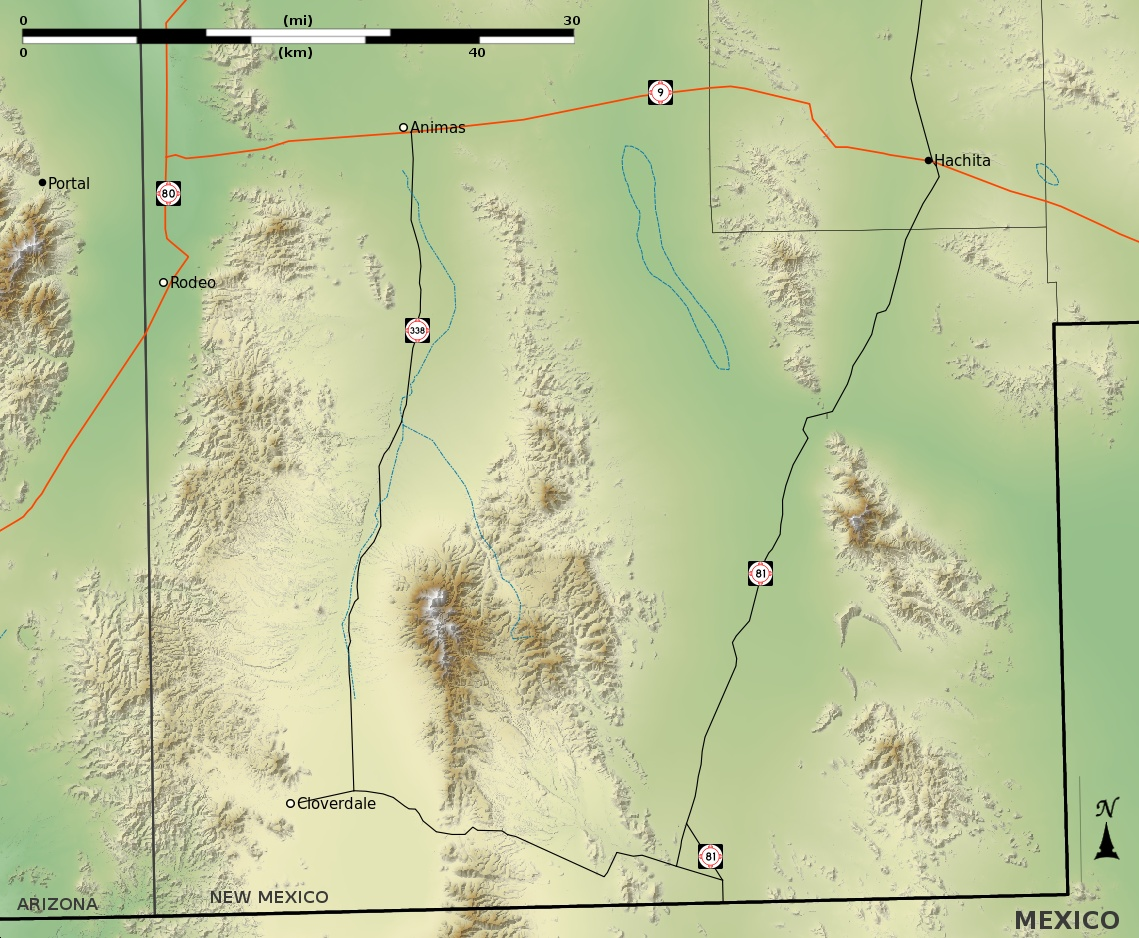
- Map of ranges in New Mexico Bootheel region, showing Animas, Playas, and Hachita Valleys (Chiricahua Mountains of Arizona, at west)

Highest point
- Peak: Pierce Peak (New Mexico), Alamo Hueco Mountains
- Elevation: 6,159 ft (1,877 m)
- Coordinates: 31°26′54″N 108°20′06″W

Dimensions
- Length: 15 mi (24 km) NW-SE
- Width: 8 mi (13 km)

Geography
- Location within New Mexico
- Country: United States
- State: New Mexico
- Regions: New Mexico Bootheel; ((northwest)-Chihuahuan Desert); Continental Divide of the Americas
- County: Hidalgo County, NM
- Communities: Alamo Hueco, NM–Pierce, NM and McFarlands, New Mexico
- Borders on: Playas Valley-NW, W & SW; Big Hatchet Mountains-N; Chihuahuan Desert–Chihuahua, Mexico-E; Dog Mountains-S

The Alamo Hueco Mountains are a 15-mile (24 km) long mountain range, located in the southeast of the New Mexico Bootheel region, southeast Hidalgo County, New Mexico, adjacent to the border of Chihuahua state, Mexico. The range lies near the southern end of the mountains bordering the extensive north–south Playas Valley; the Little Hatchet and Big Hatchet Mountains are adjacent, and mostly attached north; the mountain range series, ends south into the flatland plains of the Chihuahuan Desert. The much smaller Dog Mountains are adjacent south.

While the Continental Divide of the Americas traverses the western perimeter mountains of the Playas Valley, the Continental Divide National Scenic Trail traverses the entire mountain ranges on the east side of the Playas Valley; the Scenic Trail continues south into the Chihuahuan Desert region of northwest Chihuahua state.

== Description ==
The range is 15 mi long and only about 8 mi wide. It trends northwest by southeast and abuts the Dog Mountains to the south on the Mexico–United States border. The Alamo Hueco Mountains lie in the southeast corner of New Mexico's 'Bootheel', so the Chihuahua border also lies to the east of the mountain range.

The highest peak in the range is Pierce Peak (New Mexico), 6,159 feet (1,877 m), near the range's center-northeast; the peak is located at 31.4484°N 108.3350°W. Hat Top Mountain at 5,168 feet (1,575 m) is located on the extreme southeast of the range, and separated from the main northwest–southeast ridgeline.

== Continental Divide National Scenic Trail ==
The Continental Divide lies north of the Big Hatchet Mountains and traverses the northern Playas Valley on its water divide. The Continental Divide National Scenic Trail comes through the Big Hatchet's in two trails, at the center and one in the north; also subtrails lead off southeasterly. The main traverse of the Scenic Trail exits from the southwest quarter of the range, to meet the northwest end of the Alamo Hueco Mountains.

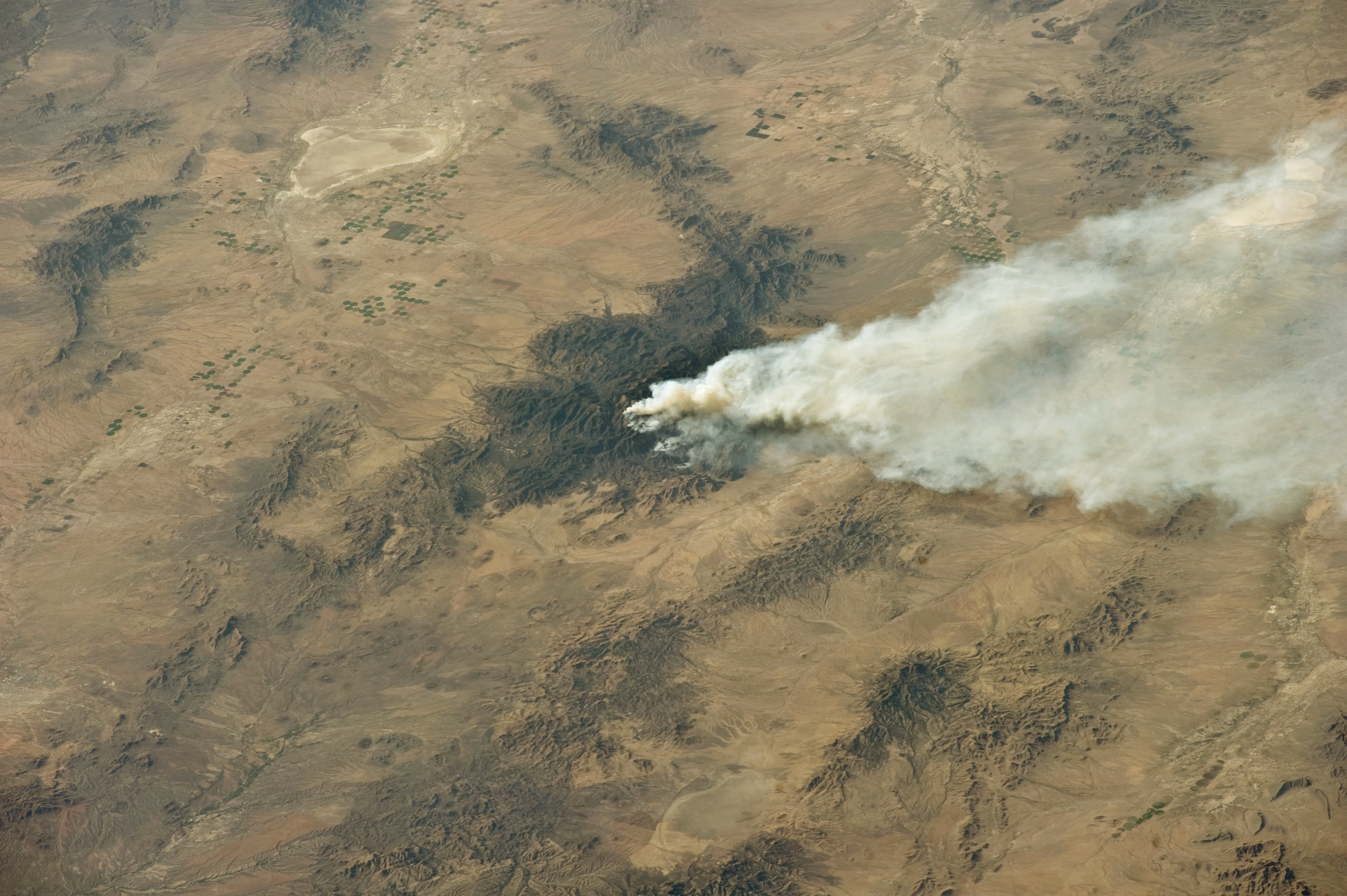
(at photo, bottom-right)
Animas and Playas Valleys, with Alamo Hueco Mountains, and south section of Big Hatchet Mountains
