= Cedar Mountain Range =

Mountain range in southwest Luna County, New Mexico, United States

- Location within New Mexico

Highest point
- Peak: Flying W Mountain, Cedar Mountain Range
- Elevation: 6,217 ft (1,895 m)
- Coordinates: 31°55′19″N 108°05′41″W

Dimensions
- Length: 20 mi (32 km) NW-SE
- Width: 6 mi (9.7 km)

Geography
- Country: United States
- State: New Mexico
- Regions: Chihuahuan Desert and Continental Divide
- Counties: Luna and Grant
- Settlements: Hachita and Hermanas
- Range coordinates: 31°57′25″N 108°08′25″W
- Borders on: Continental Divide, State Road 9 and Mexico–United States border

The Cedar Mountain Range is a short 20 mi (32 km) long, mountain range in southwest Luna County, New Mexico, USA, just north of the Mexico–United States border with Chihuahua.

The range lies in the northwest Chihuahuan Desert and the extreme northwest end of the range lies in southeast Grant County. It is here that the Continental Divide of the Americas crosses the range, turns northwest, then west, and south at the north perimeter of the north–south Playas Valley. The continental divide continues south into Mexico on the western perimeter of the Playas Valley, through three mountain ranges, the Pyramid, Animas, and San Luis Mountains (New Mexico).

== Description ==
The Cedar Mountain Range is a northwest by southeast trending range, and longer, than wide. The northwest end contains Deer Mountain, 5,494 feet (1,675 m), with an excursion of the continental divide around the wash that drains the northeast. The water divide continues through Deer Mountain and heads northwest on a circuitous route around the northern perimeter and water divide of the north Playas Valley.

Three other larger peaks dot the range: the center contains Hat Top Mountain, 5,586 feet (1,703 m) at north-center. Old Baldy, at 5,473 feet (1,668 m) is adjacent and southeast. The highest peak is at the extreme southeast end of the Cedar Mountain Range, Flying W Mountain, 6,217 feet (1,895 m), and located at 31.922041°N 108.094759°W.

== Continental Divide ==
The Continental Divide starts to leave the forested mountain regions as it goes southwest from Silver City. It passes from the southern Little Burro Mountains, crosses the Big Burro's, then on a circuitous route after skirting the northeast of the Cedar Mountain Range, it passes across the water divide of the north Playas Valley, west of Hachita. It finally enters a series of north–south ranges, including the Animas Mountains, and travels south into northwest Chihuahua, Mexico.

== See also ==
- List of peaks named Baldy, Old Baldy, 5,473 feet (1,668 m), (coordinates)
