= Whitmire Creek (Animas Mountains) =

Stream tributary in Hidalgo County, USA

Whitmire Creek is a stream tributary to Animas Creek within Hidalgo County, New Mexico. It is one of two creeks of that name that are tributary to Animas Creek in the Animas Valley. They both were named for J. B. Whitmire one of the first settlers that established the Whitmire Ranch in the area during the 1880s.

The Whitmire Creek located entirely in Hildalgo County, flows westward down from its source at 31°48′15″N 108°42′05″W, at an elevation of approximately 4,980 feet (1,520 meters) in the Animas Mountains to the east of the valley, flows from the west slope of Whitmire Pass, to its confluence with Animas Creek in the Animas Valley at an elevation of 4,600 feet (1,400 meters).
