= Elephant Butte Canyon =

Canyon in New Mexico, United States

Elephant Butte Canyon or Lawhorn Canyon is a canyon in the Animas Mountains of Hidalgo County, New Mexico. Its stream is a tributary of Walnut Creek. Its mouth is located at elevation 5,535 feet / 1,687 feet at its confluence with Walnut Creek, just below Lawhorn Tank. Its source is located at 3.5 miles north northeast of its mouth 31°36′25″N 108°39′20″W at an elevation of 6,050 feet (1,840 meters) on the southwest slope of Elephant Butte.
