= Taylor Draw =

Taylor Draw is a valley and stream tributary to Animas Creek within Hidalgo County, New Mexico. Its mouth, located at its confluence with Foster Draw, is the source of Animas Creek, at an elevation of 5,151 feet (1,570 meters) in the Animas Valley. Its source is at 31°31′15″N 108°48′40″W in the Animas Mountains.
