= Pyramid Mountains =

Mountain range in the U.S. state of New Mexico

- Location within New Mexico

Highest point
- Peak: Pyramid Peak
- Elevation: 5,994 ft (1,827 m)
- Coordinates: 32°14′16″N 108°43′08″W

Dimensions
- Length: 30 mi (48 km) N-S
- Width: 12 mi (19 km) E-W-(variable)

Geography
- Country: United States
- State: New Mexico
- Region(s): (northwest)-Chihuahuan Desert; Continental Divide of the Americas
- District: Hidalgo County, New Mexico
- Cities: Lordsburg, New Mexico; Colton City, New Mexico–Animas, New Mexico
- Range coordinates: 32°05′56″N 108°42′33″W
- Borders on: Lordsburg–I-10-N; Animas Mountains-S; Animas Valley-W & SW; Playas Valley-SE

The Pyramid Mountains are a 30 mi (48 km) long, mountain range in central-east Hidalgo County, New Mexico. The city of Lordsburg and Interstate 10 lie at its northern border.

The range lies between the northeast corner of the north–south Animas Valley on the west and the Playas and Lordsburg valleys to the southeast and northeast respectively. The continental divide passes through the southern end of the range.

The Chihuahuan Desert has its northwest extension into the foothills regions of the Pyramid Mountains.

== Description ==
The Pyramid Mountains are a moderate-altitude, north–south trending mountain range located north of two extensive north–south valleys. The Continental Divide runs due south along the ridgeline, continuing into northwest Chihuahua state, Mexico. The Animas Valley lies west; the Playas Valley lies east of this mountain-series ridgeline.

The Pyramid Mountains are about 30 mi long, and about 12 mi at its widest. Various peaks and hills form the range as the water divide of the continental divide forms its southeast and south. But the water divide of the Animas Valley continues north 20 mi and then crosses to the north side of Lordsburg.

Various semi-arid canyons, draws, and washes also are found in this linear range.

=== List of peaks and hills ===
The range consists of northern and southern portions separated by a lower-elevation pass (1,430 metres [4,690 ft]) between Jose Placencia Canyon to the west and Muir Draw to the east.

North:

- Pyramid Peak, 5,994 ft (1,827 m) (highpoint)
- Fourmile Hill, 4,339 ft (1,323 m)
- Leitendorf Hills 5,640 ft (1,720 m)
- Swallow Fork Peak, 4,957 ft (1,511 m) (west)
- Cedar Mountain, 5,154 ft (1,571 m) (east)

South:

- Cedar Knob, 4,905 ft (1,495 m) (east)
- Lightning Dock Mountain, 5,528 ft (1,685 m) (west)
- Russel Hills 5,310 ft (1,620 m) (east)
- Kink Peak, 5,361 ft (1,634 m) (west)
- South Pyramid Peak, 5,909 ft (1,801 m) (continental divide)
- Pinkey Wright Mountain, 5,538 ft (1,688 m) (continental divide)

== Continental Divide ==
The Continental Divide starts to leave the forested mountain regions as it goes southwest from Silver City. It passes from the southern Little Burro Mountains, crosses the Big Burro's, then on a circuitous route after skirting the northeast of the Cedar Mountain Range, it passes across the water divide of the north Playas Valley, west of Hachita. It finally enters a series of north–south ranges, including the Animas Mountains, and traverses south into northwest Chihuahua, Mexico.

It turns from due-west to due-south at South Pyramid Peak, at the southern perimeter region of the Pyramid Mountains. Pinkey Wright Mountain lies 3 mi south on the divide.
