= Bennett Creek (New Mexico) =

Stream in New Mexico, United States

Bennett Creek is a tributary stream in Hidalgo County, New Mexico.

The mouth of Bennett Creek is at its confluence with Gillespie Creek at an elevation of 4,902 feet (1,494 meters) at the foot of the eastern slope of the Animas Mountains in the Playas Valley. The source of Bennett Creek is at an elevation of 5,725 feet (1,745 meters) at 31°36′50″N 108°41′37″W at the foot of the Cowboy Rim in the Animas Mountains.
