= Bull Creek (Animas Creek tributary) =

Bull Creek is a stream tributary to Animas Creek within Hidalgo County, New Mexico. Bull Creek is located east of Animas Creek, flows westward down from its source at 31°39′54″N 108°41′28″W, at an elevation of approximately 5,720 feet / 1,740 meters in the Animas Mountains to the east of the valley. It flows northwest from the west slope of Gillespie Mountain, to its confluence with Animas Creek in the Animas Valley at an elevation of 4,869 feet / 1,484 meters.
