= Walnut Creek (Playas Valley, New Mexico) =

Walnut Creek is an intermittent stream in Hidalgo County, New Mexico. It has its source in the Animas Mountains on the east slope of the Continental Divide at an elevation of 6,720 feet (2,050 meters) at 31°33′15″N 108°41′37″W. Its mouth is located at an elevation of 4,524 feet (1,379 meters) where it subsides into the Playas Valley.
