= Animas Creek =

River in New Mexico, United States

Animas Creek is an intermittent stream in the Animas Valley within Hidalgo County, New Mexico. Is source is located at the confluence of Foster Draw and Taylor Draw, at 31°30′28″N 108°52′09″W an elevation of 5,151 feet (1,570 meters). Its mouth is in the Animas Valley, in at an elevation of 4,662 feet (1,421 meters). However, topographic maps show its wash runs farther northward to the southern outskirts of Animas, New Mexico at 31°55′51″N 108°49′36″W.

The tributaries of Animas Creek from its source northward to its mouth are:

- Clanton Draw from the Peloncillo Mountains.
- Last Chance Draw from the Animas Mountains.
- Whitmire Creek, from the Peloncillo Mountains.
- Black Bill Canyon, from the Animas Mountains.
- Bercham Draw, from the Peloncillo Mountains.
- Horse Camp Draw (Animas Creek), from the Peloncillo Mountains.
- Baldy Mountain Canyon, from the Peloncillo Mountains.
- Indian Creek, from the Animas Mountains.
- Miner Canyon, from the Peloncillo Mountains.
- Double Adobe Creek, from the Animas Mountains.
- Pig Pen Creek, from the Animas Mountains.
- Cabin Canyon, from the Peloncillo Mountains.
- Bull Creek, from the Animas Mountains.
- McClean Creek, from the Animas Mountains.
- Whitmire Creek, from the Animas Mountains.
- Willow Creek, from the Animas Mountains.
- Big Creek, from the Peloncillo Mountains.
