= Big Hatchet Peak =

Mountain in New Mexico, United States

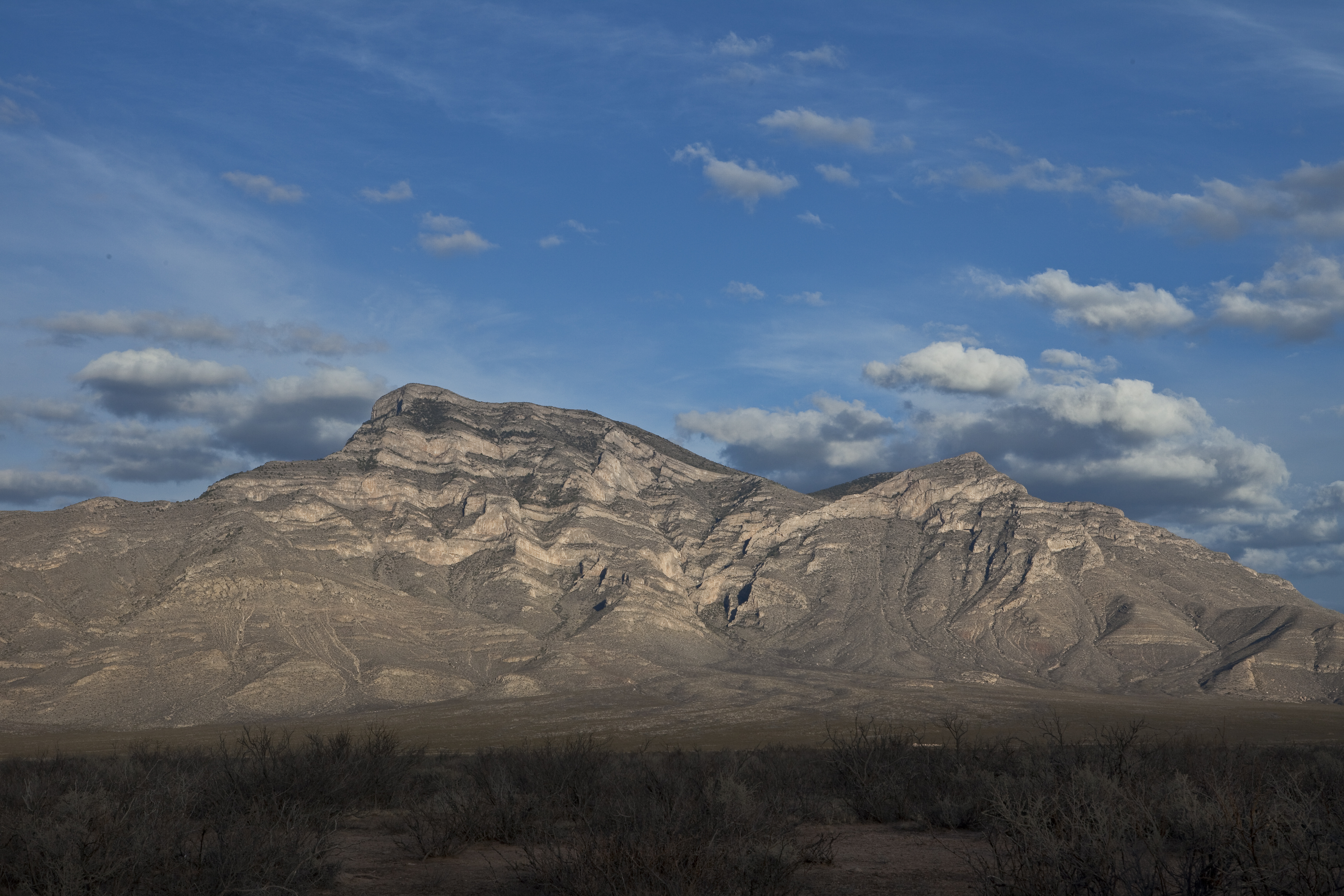
- Big Hatchet Peak viewed from the west

Highest point
- Elevation: 8,359 ft (2,548 m) NAVD 88
- Prominence: 3,696 ft (1,127 m)
- Coordinates: 31°38′08″N 108°23′55″W

Geography
- Location within New Mexico
- Location: Hidalgo County, New Mexico, U.S.
- Parent range: Big Hatchet Mountains
- Topo map: USGS Big Hatchet Peak

Climbing
- Easiest route: Hike

Big Hatchet Peak is the high point of the Big Hatchet Mountains, a small but rugged range in the southwest corner (the "Bootheel") of New Mexico, in the United States. The mountains are located in southeast Hidalgo County, about 50 miles (80 km) southwest of Deming. The range runs roughly northwest–southeast, and is about 12 miles (19 km) long; the southeastern edge of the range is within 3.5 miles (6 km) of the border with Mexico. They lie primarily on BLM land.

The peak rises steeply out of the Playas Valley, to the west, and the Hachita Valley, to the east of the range. The summit stands about 4,000 feet above the valley floors. Also, the north and west faces of the peak are particularly steep, making for an impressive mountain. There are a few other minor summits in this small range, but most are not named, except for Zeller Peak two miles north, and New Well Peak with a summit elevation of 6,284 feet (1,915 m) and which anchors the southeast end of the mountains.

Geologically this range is part of the Basin and Range Province which spans much of the southwestern U.S. and parts of northern Mexico. It is a fault-block range made up of Paleozoic limestone and Cretaceous shale and sandstones.

Ecologically, the Big Hatchet Mountains lie near the Chihuahuan Desert and the Sonoran Desert, but their large relief provides many ecological niches more in keeping with the mountains to the north. Notable inhabitants include bats, raptors, bighorn sheep, and javelina.

The Big Hatchet Mountains are far from population centers, and have no paved road access or developed recreation sites; they therefore see little recreational activity. However the standard route on the peak, along the South Ridge from Thompson Canyon, is straightforward.

== Gallery ==
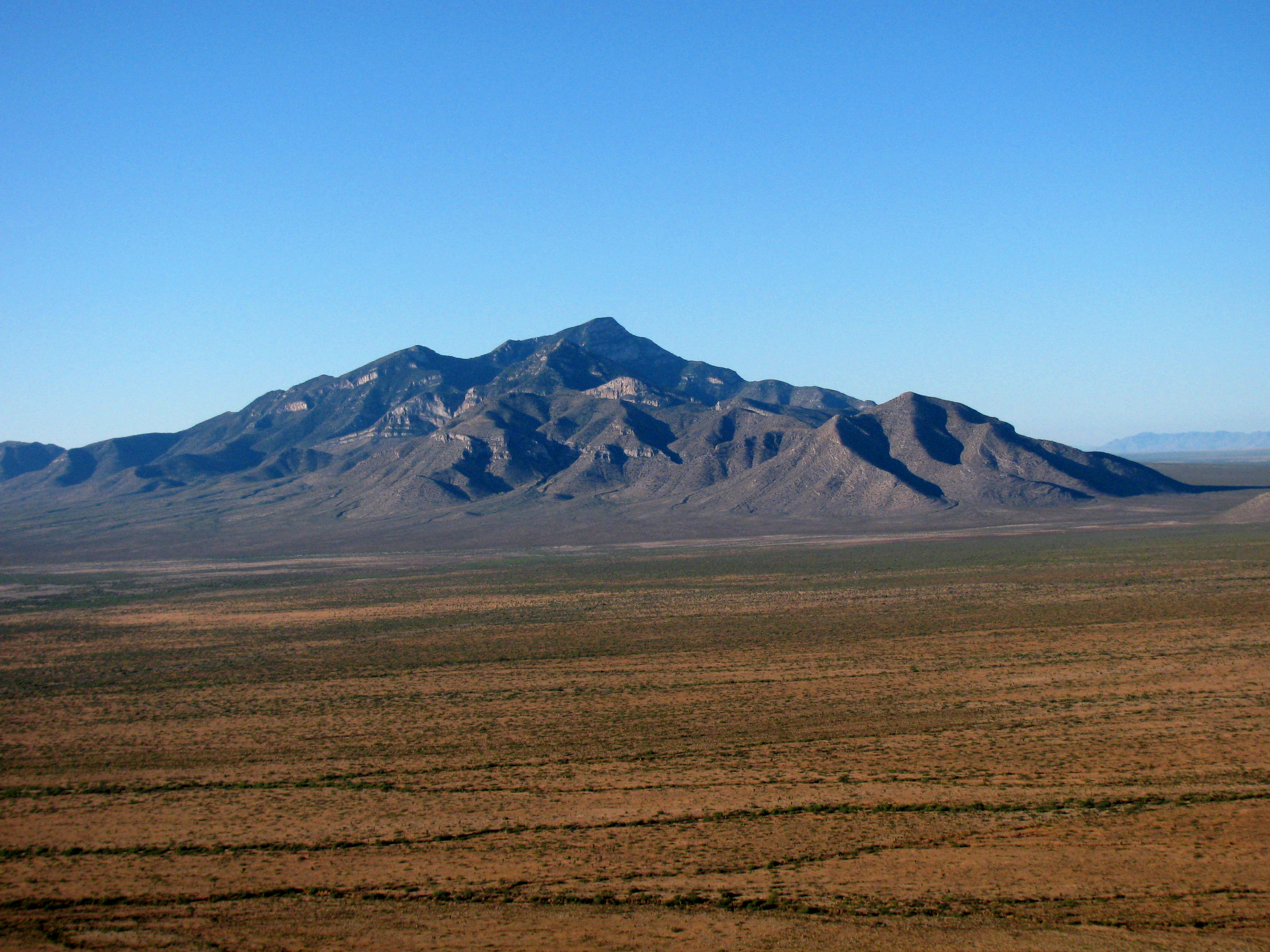
Big Hatchet Peak from the northeast
