= Whitmire Creek (Peloncillo Mountains) =

Stream in Hidalgo County, New Mexico

Whitmire Creek is a stream tributary to Animas Creek within Hidalgo County, New Mexico. Its source is in Whitmire Canyon in the Peloncillo Mountains in Cochise County, Arizona. It is one of two creeks of that name that are tributary to Animas Creek in the Animas Valley. They both were named for J. B. Whitmire one of the first settlers that established the Whitmire Ranch in the area during the 1880s.

Whitmire Creek has its source in Whitmire Canyon at an elevation of 5,960 feet (1,820 meters), at 31°32′20″N 109°03′03″W just over the state line in Cochise County, Arizona. Its mouth lies at an elevation of 5,029 feet (1,533 meters) at its confluence with Animas Creek. It has its confluence with its tributary Walnut Creek, at the mouth of Whitmire Canyon.
