= Little Burro Mountains =

Mountain range in New Mexico, United States

- Location within New Mexico

Highest point
- Peak: Eagle Point (Little Burro Mountains)
- Elevation: 6,500 ft (2,000 m)
- Coordinates: 32°42′20″N 108°23′11″W

Dimensions
- Length: 15 mi (24 km) NW-SE
- Width: 5 mi (8.0 km)

Geography
- Country: United States
- State: New Mexico
- Region(s): (northwest)-Chihuahuan Desert; Continental Divide of the Americas
- County: Grant County, NM
- Settlements: Tyrone, NM; Oak Grove, NM; Silver City, NM
- Range coordinates: 32°42′20″N 108°23′11″W
- Borders on: Big Burro Mountains-NW & W; Silver City Range–Silver City, NM-NE

The Little Burro Mountains are a short 15 mi (24 km) long mountain range located in Grant County, New Mexico. The range lies adjacent to the southeast border of the larger Big Burro Mountains. The Little Burro Mountains are located 8 mi southwest of Silver City. State Road 90 from Silver City skirts the southern perimeter of the range on its route to Lordsburg.

The Continental Divide traverses the southern ridgeline of the Little Burro's and continues on its southwest flank.

== Description and region ==
The Little Burro Mountains are only a 15 mi long range. It has a northwest by southeast ridgeline, and is attached to the Big Burro Mountains that trend in the same direction. The small valley between contains Mangas Valley Road which connects Oak Grove on State Road 90 with Mangas Springs which lies on the northeast perimeter of the Big Burro Mountains. Mangas Creek and its confluence with the lengthy Gila River that completely crosses Arizona is adjacent just northwest.

=== Peaks ===
The highest peak in the Little Burro Mountains is Eagle Peak, at 6,500 feet (1,981 m). It is located at 32.705632°N 112.933236°W. Two other peaks are noted, in the north Wind Mountain, at 6,247 feet (1,904 m), and Bald Mountain in the mountains southeast, and on the continental divide, at 6,396 feet (1,950 m).

=== Access ===
The small range is surrounded by routes. Mangas Valley Road is on the southwest travelling to the northwest. The southeast has the entire length of State Road 90. The northeast and north has U.S. Route 180 the major route from Deming, north and northwest to Alpine, AZ; it connects to Mangas Springs north of the range.

== Continental Divide ==
The Continental Divide starts to leave the forested mountain regions as it goes southwest from Silver City. It passes from the southern Little Burro Mountains, crosses the Big Burro's, then on a circuitous route after skirting the northeast of the Cedar Mountain Range, it passes across the water divide of the north Playas Valley, west of Hachita. It finally enters a series of north–south ranges, including the Animas Mountains, and travels south into northwest Chihuahua, Mexico.
