= Bercham Draw =

Tributary stream in Hidalgo County, New Mexico

Bercham Draw is a tributary stream of Animas Creek in Hidalgo County, New Mexico.

Bercham Draw is located west of Animas Creek, flows eastward down from its source at 31°36′46″N 108°57′58″W, at an elevation of approximately 5,540 feet (1,690 meters) in the Peloncillo Mountains to the west of the valley, to its confluence with Animas Creek in the Animas Valley at an elevation of 4,993 feet (1,522 meters).
