= Foster Draw =

Valley in Hidalgo County, New Mexico, United States

Foster Draw is a valley and stream tributary to Animas Creek within Hidalgo County, New Mexico. Its mouth, located at its confluence with Taylor Draw, is the source of Animas Creek, at an elevation of 5,151 feet (1,570 meters) in the Animas Valley. Its source is at 31°28′57″N 108°59′47″W in the Peloncillo Mountains.

Foster Draw may be named after Stephen Clark Foster, the translator and sometime scout for Lt. Col. Philip St. George Cooke and the Mormon Battalion expeditions officers and it lies along the course of Cooke's Wagon Road.
