= Augusta Northern Railway =

Former American shortline railroad

The Augusta Northern Railway was a shortline railroad that served western South Carolina in the first half of the 20th century.

The carrier was incorporated as the Newberry, Whitmire and Augusta Railroad Company, by the South Carolina General Assembly in 1906, and "authorized to construct and operate a railroad from any point on the North Carolina State line through or by the town" of Whitmire, South Carolina, or other point that might be found more desirable, thence on through Newberry County, South Carolina, Saluda County, South Carolina and Edgefield County, South Carolina, to Augusta, Georgia.

The charter was amended in February 1910 to change to corporate name to the Augusta Northern. Construction began in September 1910 and was completed in the spring of 1912.

The independent line ran from Saluda, South Carolina, to Ward, South Carolina, a distance of a little more than 11 miles. The line was abandoned in 1941.
