= Elephant Butte (Hidalgo County, New Mexico) =

Geographic feature in New Mexico, United States

Coordinates: 31°36′40″N 108°38′58″W

Elephant Butte is a summit in Hidalgo County, New Mexico. It lies at an elevation of 6,361 feet (1,939 meters), on the Cowboy Rim of the Animas Mountains.
