= Pyramid Peak (New Mexico) =

Mountain in New Mexico, United States

Coordinates: 32°14′16″N 108°43′08″W

Pyramid Peak, is the highest peak in the range of the Pyramid Mountains at 6,001 feet (1,829 m), in Hidalgo County, New Mexico. Pyramid Peak is located 7.5 miles south of Lordsburg in the Pyramid Mountains. It has also been called Big Pyramid Mountain and North Pyramid Peak.
