= Hachita Valley =

Valley in New Mexico, United States of America

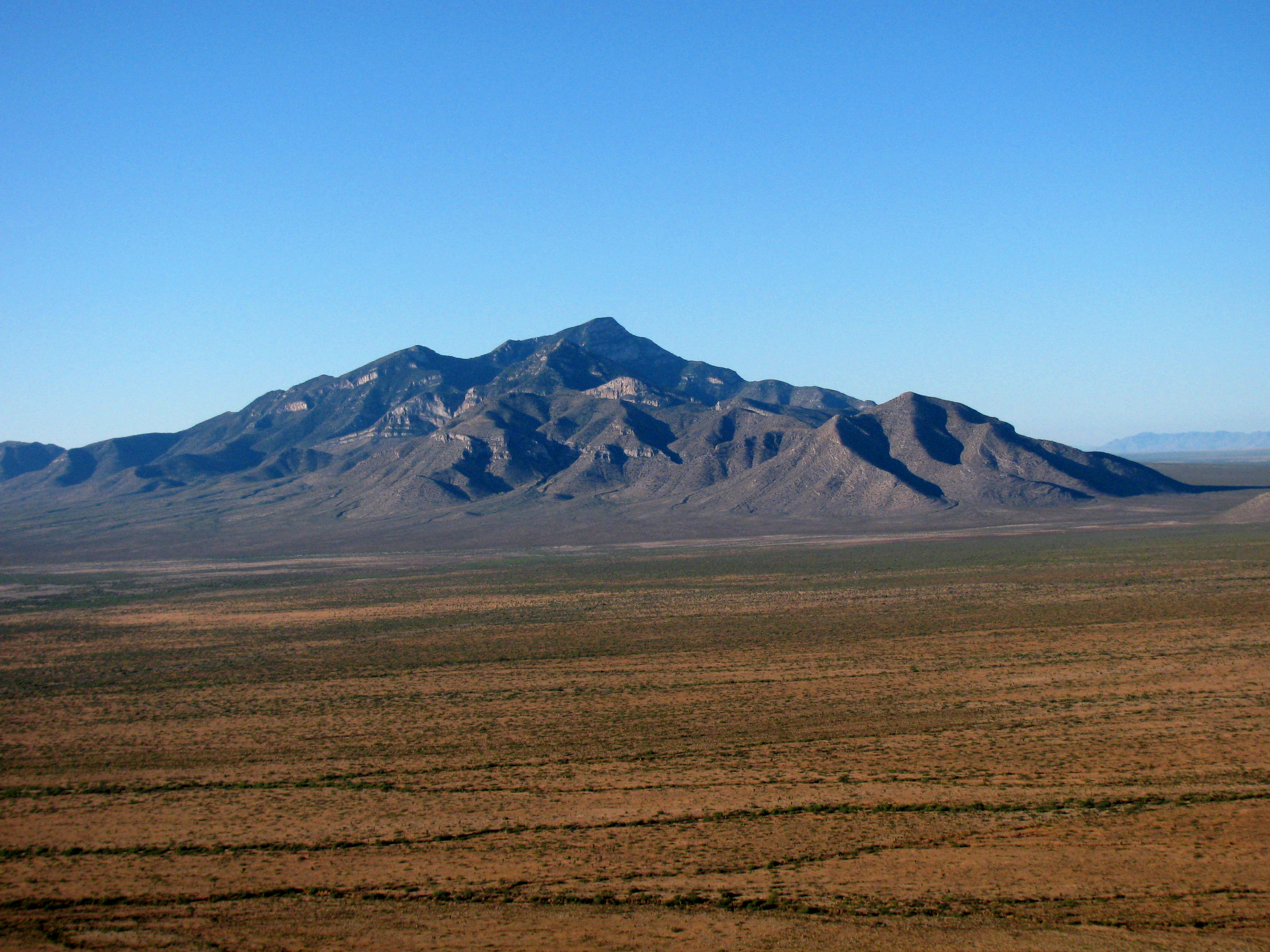
- center Hatchet Valley (north region) view southwest to Big Hatchet Mountains & Peak

- Location within New Mexico
- Length: 35 mi (56 km)
- Width: 7 mi (11 km)

Geography
- Location: United States, New Mexico, Hidalgo & Grant
- Borders on: Howell's Ridge-NNW; Little Hatchet Mountains-W & NW; Big Hatchet Mountains-SW; Apache Hills-E & SE; Chihuahua state, Mexico-SSE
- Coordinates: 31°45′58″N 108°23′04″W
- Interactive map of Hachita Valley

The Hachita Valley, (Spanish language hacho, hatchet-(axe), hachita, little hatchet; Little Hatchet Valley), is a small valley in southwest New Mexico. The valley is in the east of the New Mexico Bootheel region and borders Chihuahua state, Mexico. Hachita, New Mexico lies in the valley's northeast, where New Mexico State Road 9 traverses east–west across much of southern New Mexico. The large, and extensive north–south Playas Valley borders to the west on the other side of the west perimeter mountain ranges.

The Hachita Valley lies in the northwest of the Chihuahuan Desert, with the southeast of the valley draining southeast into desert regions of northern Chihuahua. The Hachita Valley is created because of the three surrounding mountainous regions; the north is more bajada-like, and extends north to foothills of higher elevation mountain regions, transitioning to the Continental Divide of the Americas.

The valley is located in Hidalgo County, but the extreme north drains from north of Hachita in south Grant County.

== Description ==
Hachita Valley is a north–south valley in its north region of about 20 mi in length; the south turns abruptly southeastwards for 15 mi to exit into the Chihuahuan Desert lower elevations in northern Chihuahua. The Apache Hills are the large section of the hills in the east and northeast causing the valley's curvature. A major central wash follows the valley's southeast; the north has no major wash, and instead drainages are towards a central bajada landform region. The northern bajada extends north past Hachita, NM on the east and Old Hachita, NM on the west.

The southeasterly excursion of the valley is caused by the bordering Big Hatchet Mountains on the southwest, which trend southeast; the valley narrows here, between the Apache Hills northeast, to between 5 and 7 mi wide. In the northwest where the valley widens, the Little Hatchet Mountains lie on the west perimeter. The site of Old Hachita is on the Little Burro's northeast; Playas, NM lies on the northwest.

Twelvemile Wells is near the valley's center, and is just north of where the southeast valley excursion starts, near the beginning of the southeast washes. In the northeast of the Big Hatchet Mountains, bordering the southwest valley lies the Big Hatchet Mountains Wilderness Study Area.

== Access ==
New Mexico State Road 81 traverses the north section of the valley from Hachita, and goes southwest to the Playas Valley through Hachita Gap, between the Little and Big Hatchet Mountains.
