= Whitmire Spring =

Water source in Hidalgo County, New Mexico

Coordinates: 31°49′43″N 108°34′38″W

Whitmire Spring is a spring in Hidalgo County, New Mexico. Correctly named on the Playas Lake South U. S. topographic map, it is mistakenly called Whitmore Spring on the U.S. Geological Survey Geographic Names Information System. The spring was named after J. B. Whitmire, a rancher in the 1880s, owner of the Whitmire Ranch. Whitmire Spring lies at an elevation of 4,291 feet / 1,308 meters, on the west shore of Playas Lake, near the site of the Whitmire Ranch. Whitmire Spring is one of a number of springs and seeps bordering the western edge of Playas Lake. Its water has its source in the Animas Mountains nearby to the west.

== History ==
Whitmire Spring was a stopping point of the expedition of Lt. Col. Philip St. George Cooke and the Mormon Battalion from November 23–24, 1846. The expedition's route became known as Cooke's Wagon Road, and was part of the southern route of the 49ers to California during the California Gold Rush. The spring was the first significant source of water found by the expedition after two days and 40 miles travel, southwest of Burro Cienega. Whitmire Pass through which Cooke's expedition crossed the Animas Mountains on November 25 lies 7 miles west southwest of the springs.

After the early 1850s this part of Cooke's route was replaced by the shorter Tucson Cutoff as the main route of east–west travel. Toward the end of the Apache Wars, during the 1880s J. B. Whitmire was the first settler at the springs and made them the site of his ranch house until he sold out.

== See also ==
- Whitmire Canyon
