= Playas Lake =

Playa in Hidalgo County, New Mexico

- Location within New Mexico
- Location: Hidalgo County, New Mexico
- Coordinates: 31°52′27″N 108°35′08″W
- Type: dry lake
- Surface elevation: 4,278 feet (1,304 m)

Playas Lake is a dry lake or playa in Hidalgo County, New Mexico, United States. It lies at an elevation of 4,278 feet (1,304 m). It consists of a long dry lake running north northwest south southeast within the Playas Valley between the Animas Mountains on the west and the Little Hatchet Mountains on the east.

== History ==
From November 1846 to the early 1850s Cooke's Wagon Road crossed Playas Lake to Whitmire Spring from the northeast. Later from the early 1880s, Whitmire Spring was the site of the Whitmire Ranch.
