= Janos Biosphere Reserve =

Nature reserve in Janos, Mexico

- IUCN category VI (protected area with sustainable use of natural resources)
- Location within Mexico Location within Chihuahua
- Location: Chihuahua, Mexico
- Nearest city: Janos
- Coordinates: 30°57′37.8″N 108°23′01.5″W
- Area: 526,482 ha (2,032.76 sq mi)
- Designation: Biosphere reserve
- Designated: 2009
- Governing body: National Commission of Natural Protected Areas

The Janos Biosphere Reserve (Spanish: Reserva de la Biosfera de Janos) is a nature reserve in Janos, Chihuahua, Mexico. It protects a prairie ecosystem best known for its recovering and reintroduced species most notably the herd of American bison (Bison bison) which became the first re-established in Mexico. It is the first federally protected area of Mexico with the main objective of protecting a grassland ecosystem.

The reserve is contiguous with the border of the United States and part of the Malpai Borderlands, a ranching and conservation area in New Mexico and Arizona.

== History ==
The region contains petroglyphs and arrowheads left by prehistoric hunter-gatherers. The region would have been under the influence of the Mogollon culture, part of the Oasisamerica grouping of cultures. The town of Janos was founded in 1580 by Franciscan missionaries and a military garrison was established in 1686 to protect it from Apache raids.

As a result of agrarian reform in the 1930s and 1940s, federal lands and cattle ranches that later became Janos were redistributed to the landless poor. In subsequent years, overgrazing and forestry companies significantly altered environmental conditions in the area, contributing to the extinction of grizzly bears (Ursus arctos horribilis), Mexican wolves (Canis lupus baileyi) and imperial woodpeckers (Campephilus imperialis) that inhabited the mountains.

In 1988, a complex of black-tailed prairie dog (Cynomys ludovicianu) burrows estimated to be 55,000 hectares (140,000 acres) was discovered. In 1991, the Institute of Ecology of the National Autonomous University of Mexico (UNAM) began the first biological studies in the area and in 2001 a reintroduction program of the endangered black-footed ferret (Mustela nigripes) was started by the institution. In January 2002, the process to be included in the Comisión Nacional de Áreas Naturales Protegidas (CONANP) was initiated.

Mexican wolf (Canis lupus baileyi) became locally extinct within Mexico. Captive breeding program was launched within the US, and reintroductions have been made among the US and Mexico. Janos Reserve was one of those sites for reintroductions in 2009.

On 28 November 2009, twenty-three genetically pure American bison (Bison bison), including twenty females and three males, from the Wind Cave bison herd in South Dakota were released onto the Janos prairie. The new Janos Biopsphere Reserve bison herd adds to other Mexican bison that have ranged between Chihuahua, Mexico, and New Mexico, United States, since at least the 1920s. This older population is known as the Janos-Hidalgo bison herd, and its persistence for nearly 100 years confirms that habitat for bison is suitable in northern Mexico. This is consistent with archeological records and historical accounts from Mexican archives from AD 700 to the 19th century documenting that the southern extent of the historic range of the bison included northern Mexico and adjoining areas in the United States. On 8 December 2009, the Janos Biosphere Reserve was officially created through a presidential decree by then-President Felipe Calderón and published in the Official Journal of the Federation. As of May 2017, there were 138 bison living at Janos.

In 2020, 19 plains bisons were transported to Maderas del Carmen, and formed the second rewilded herd in Mexico.

== Ecology ==
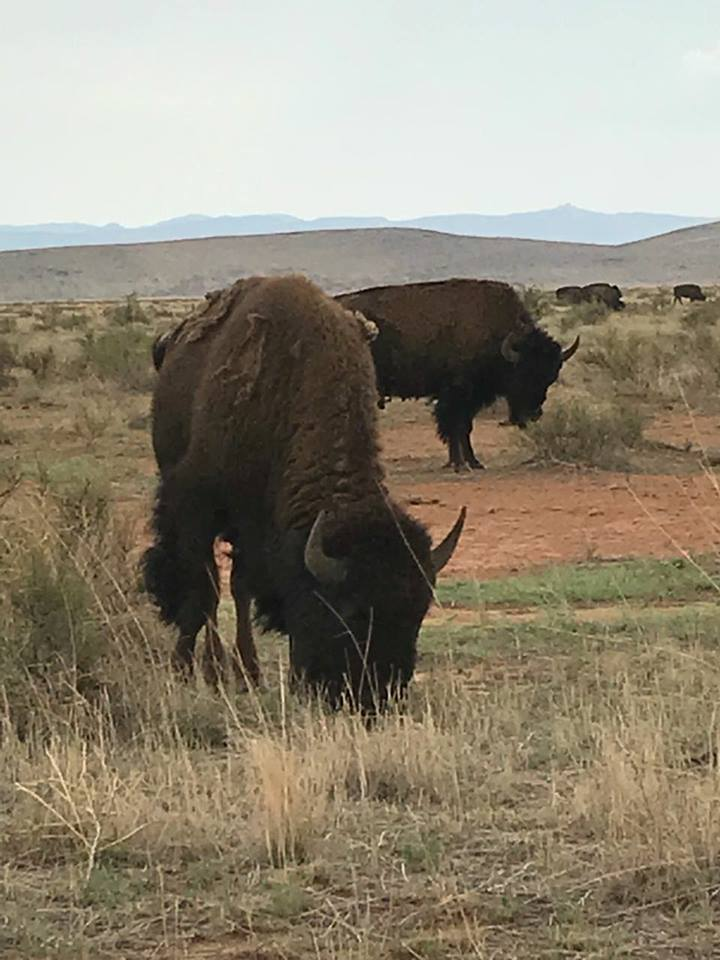
Plains bisons in the reserve.

The total area of the reserve is 526,482 hectares (1,300,970 acres; 2,032.76 sq mi), which includes 218,630 hectares (540,200 acres) of grassland, 65,539 hectares (161,950 acres) of pine-oak forests, 24,873 hectares (61,460 acres) of halophyte vegetation and 3,681 hectares (9,100 acres) of riparian areas.

There are 383 species of fauna in the reserve, of which 79 are mammals, 257 aves, 34 reptiles and 13 amphibians. Notable animal species in the reserve include: the pronghorn (Antilocapra americana), North American porcupine (Erethizon dorsatum), green toad (Anaxyrus debilis), cougar (Puma concolor), burrowing owl (Athene cunicularia), golden eagle (Aquila chrysaetos) and American black bear (Ursus americanus).

Notable plant species in the reserve include the cimarron walnut (Juglans major) and biznaga cabeza de viejo (Mammillaria senilis). In mountains of the reserve there are forests of quaking aspen (Populus tremuloides), which are rare in Mexico.

== See also ==
- Malpai Borderlands
- Mexican Protected Natural Areas
- List of protected grasslands of North America
