= Newberry, Whitmire and Augusta Railroad =

The Newberry, Whitmire and Augusta Railroad was a South Carolina railroad company founded in the early part of the 20th century.

The Newberry, Whitmire and Augusta was chartered by the South Carolina General Assembly in 1906.

The carrier was "authorized to construct and operate a railroad from any point on the North Carolina State line through or by the town" of Whitmire, South Carolina, or other point that might be found more desirable, thence on through Newberry County, South Carolina, Saluda County, South Carolina and Edgefield County, South Carolina, to Augusta, Georgia.

The charter was amended in February 1910 to change to corporate name to the Augusta Northern Railway. Construction began in September 1910 and was completed in the spring of 1912.

The independent line served Western South Carolina until it was abandoned in 1941.
