= New Mexico Bootheel =

Southwestern corner of the US state of New Mexico

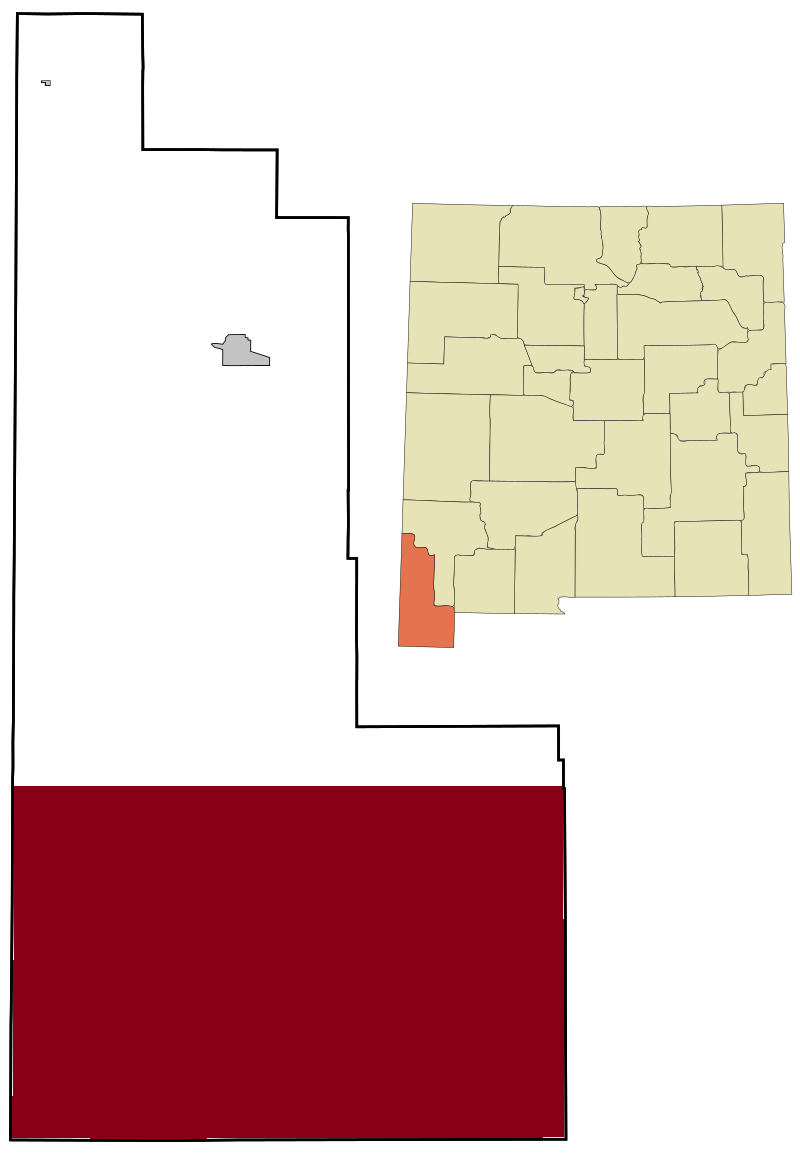
Location of the Bootheel of New Mexico within Hidalgo County, and the location of Hidalgo County within the State of New Mexico

The New Mexico Bootheel is a salient (protrusion) which comprises the southwestern corner of New Mexico and the southern part of Hidalgo County. As part of the Gadsden Purchase it is bounded on the east by the Mexican state of Chihuahua along a line at 31°47′0″N 108°12′30″W extending south to latitude 31°20′0″N at 31°20′0″N 108°12′30″W. The southern border is shared between the Mexican states of Chihuahua and Sonora along latitude 31°20′0″N, while the western border with Arizona is along meridian 109°03′0″W at 31°20′0″N 109°03′0″W, bounding an area of 50 by 30 miles (80 km × 48 km) and comprising 1,500 square miles (3,900 km^{2}).

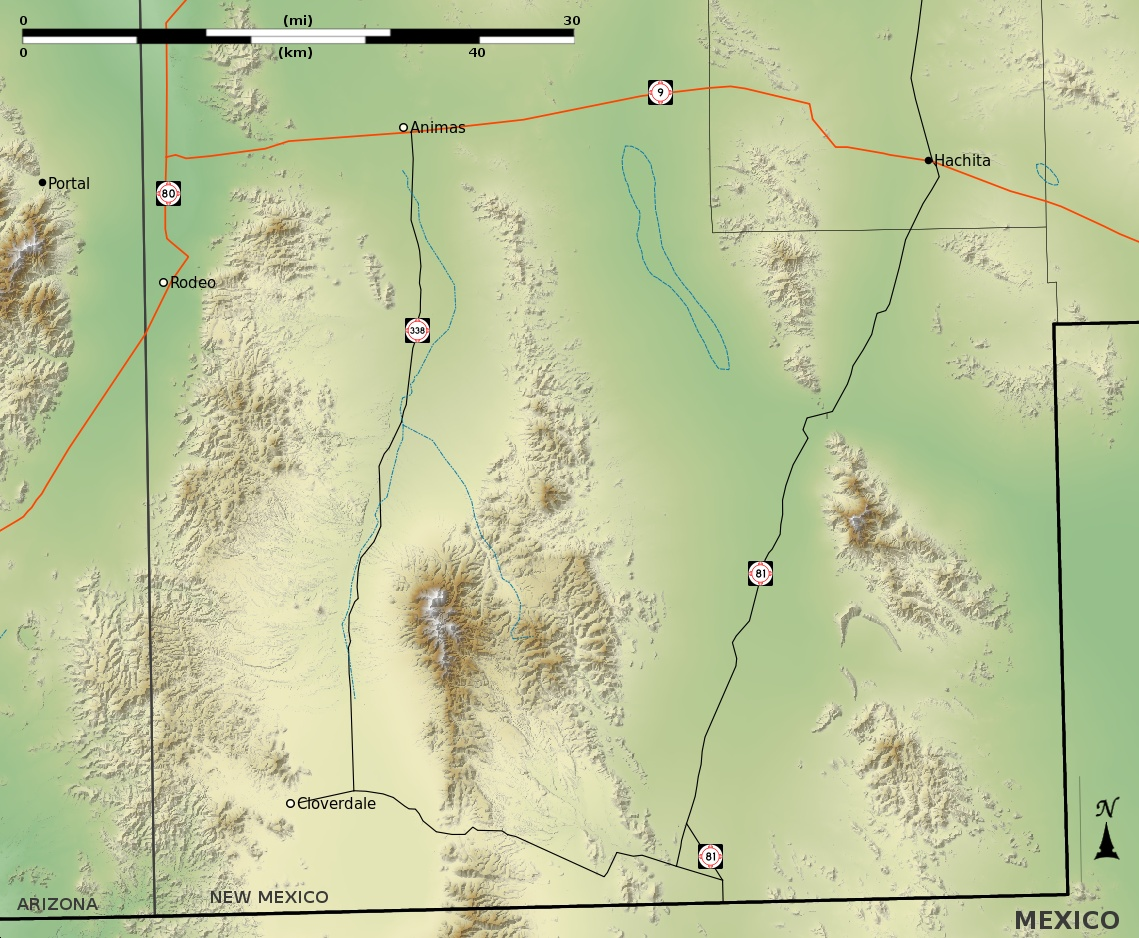
Topographical map of the New Mexico Bootheel

It is characterized by basin and range topography with three north south trending mountain ranges, the Peloncillo Mountains, the Animas Mountains, and the Big Hatchet Mountains, separated by four valleys, the San Simon, Animas, Playas, and Hachita valleys. A single road traverses just north of the bootheel, New Mexico State Road 9, while New Mexico State Road 80 (former US-80) skirts the western edge running south through the San Simon Valley. The other two roads in the bootheel are State Road 338 running down Animas Valley and State Road 81 running from Hachita to Antelope Wells, a border crossing.

The Bootheel is a sparsely populated (less than 1 person per square mile or 2.6 km^{2}) region known primarily as a cattle-ranching area, with the best-known ranch being the 500-square-mile (1,300 km^{2}) Diamond A Ranch in the Animas Valley, although mining also played a part in the development of the bootheel with the abandoned mining town of old Hachita. Land ownership is divided between publicly owned state and federal lands covering much of the mountain ranges and private lands in the valleys. The only settlement is Antelope Wells, while the towns of Rodeo, Animas, and Hachita lie just to the northwest, north, and northeast respectively. The former Phelps Dodge mining town of Playas is now a training facility for the United States Department of Homeland Security.

== See also ==
- Missouri Bootheel
