= Big Hatchet Mountains =

Mountain range in Hidalgo County, New Mexico, United States

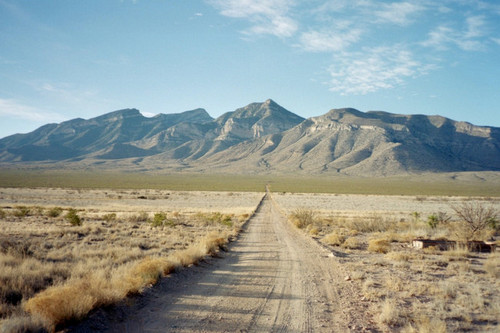
- Big Hatchet Peak at extreme northwest end of range

Highest point
- Peak: Big Hatchet Peak-(northwest perimeter of range), Big Hatchet Mountains
- Elevation: 8,356 ft (2,547 m)
- Coordinates: 31°38′07″N 108°23′56″W

Dimensions
- Length: 18 mi (29 km) NW-SE
- Width: 8 mi (13 km)

Geography
- Location within New Mexico
- Country: United States
- State: New Mexico
- Region(s): New Mexico Bootheel ((northwest)-Chihuahuan Desert); Continental Divide of the Americas
- District: Hidalgo County NM
- Settlement: Hachita, NM
- Range coordinates: 31°35′50″N 108°20′14″W
- Borders on: Little Hatchet Mountains-NNW; Hatchita Valley-N & NE; Playas Valley-NW, W & SW; Alamo Hueco Mountains-S

The Big Hatchet Mountains are an 18 mi (29 km) long mountain range in southeast Hidalgo County, New Mexico, adjacent to the northern border of Chihuahua state, Mexico.

The range lies just south of a westerly excursion of the Continental Divide of the Americas; it lies on the eastern perimeter of the extensive, narrow, and north–south Playas Valley, and is the center range of three mostly arid, low to moderate-elevation ranges that lie on the valley's east perimeter. The mountain range lies in the extreme northwest of the Chihuahuan Desert.

== Description ==
The range is 18 miles (29 km) long and only about eight miles (13 km) wide. It trends northwest by southeast as does the Alamo Hueco Mountains to the south; the Little Hatchet Mountains bordering the range northwest, trend similarly, but have a more true north traverse.

=== Geology, ecology, and access ===
Geologically this range is part of the Basin and Range Province which spans much of the southwestern U.S. and parts of northern Mexico. It is a fault-block range made up of Paleozoic limestone and Cretaceous shale and sandstones.

Ecologically, the Big Hatchet Mountains lie near the Chihuahuan Desert and the Sonoran Desert, but their large relief provides many ecological niches more in keeping with the mountains to the north. Notable inhabitants include bats, raptors, bighorn sheep, and javelina.

The Big Hatchet Mountains are far from population centers, and have no paved road access or developed recreation sites; they therefore see little recreational activity other than long-distance hikers who are either starting or completing the Continental Divide Trail. However, the standard route on the peak, along the South Ridge from Thompson Canyon, is straightforward.

=== Highpoints ===
The highest peak in the range, Big Hatchet Peak, 8,366 feet (2,550 m), is at the northwest terminus of the range; the peak is located at 31°38′07″N 108°23′56″W. Zeller Peak 7,426 feet (2,263 m) is two miles north of Big Hatchet Peak. Another peak anchors the southeast terminus of the range, New Well Peak, at 6,284 feet (1,915 m).

== Continental Divide National Scenic Trail ==
The Continental Divide lies north of the Big Hatchet Mountains and traverses the northern Playas Valley on its water divide. The Continental Divide National Scenic Trail (CDT) is routed through the Big Hatchets on two alternative trails, one at the center and the other in the north; also subtrails lead off in a southeasterly direction. The main traverse of the CDT exits from the southwest quarter of the range, to meet the northwest end of the Alamo Hueco Mountains.

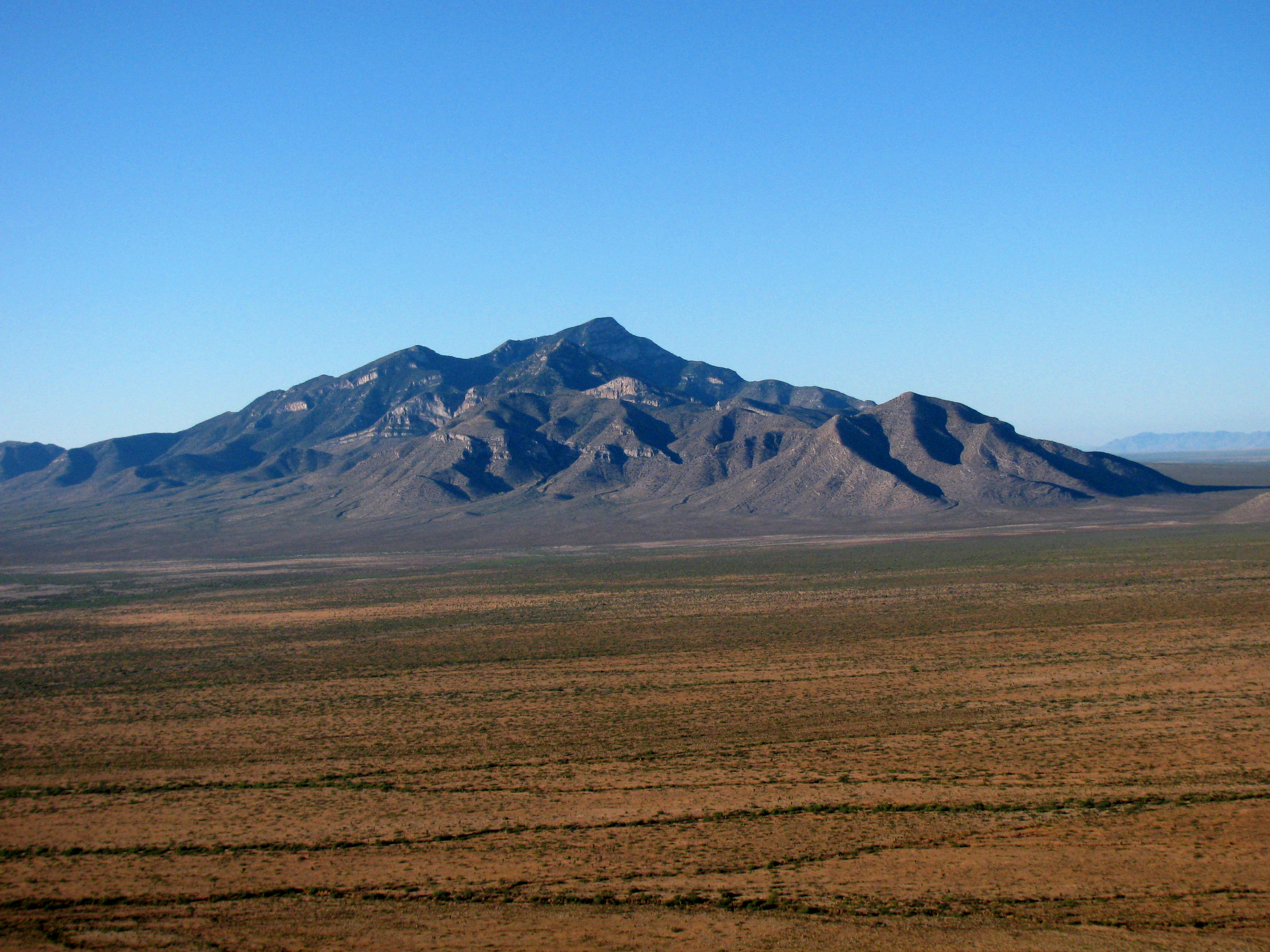
Big Hatchet Mountains from the northeast

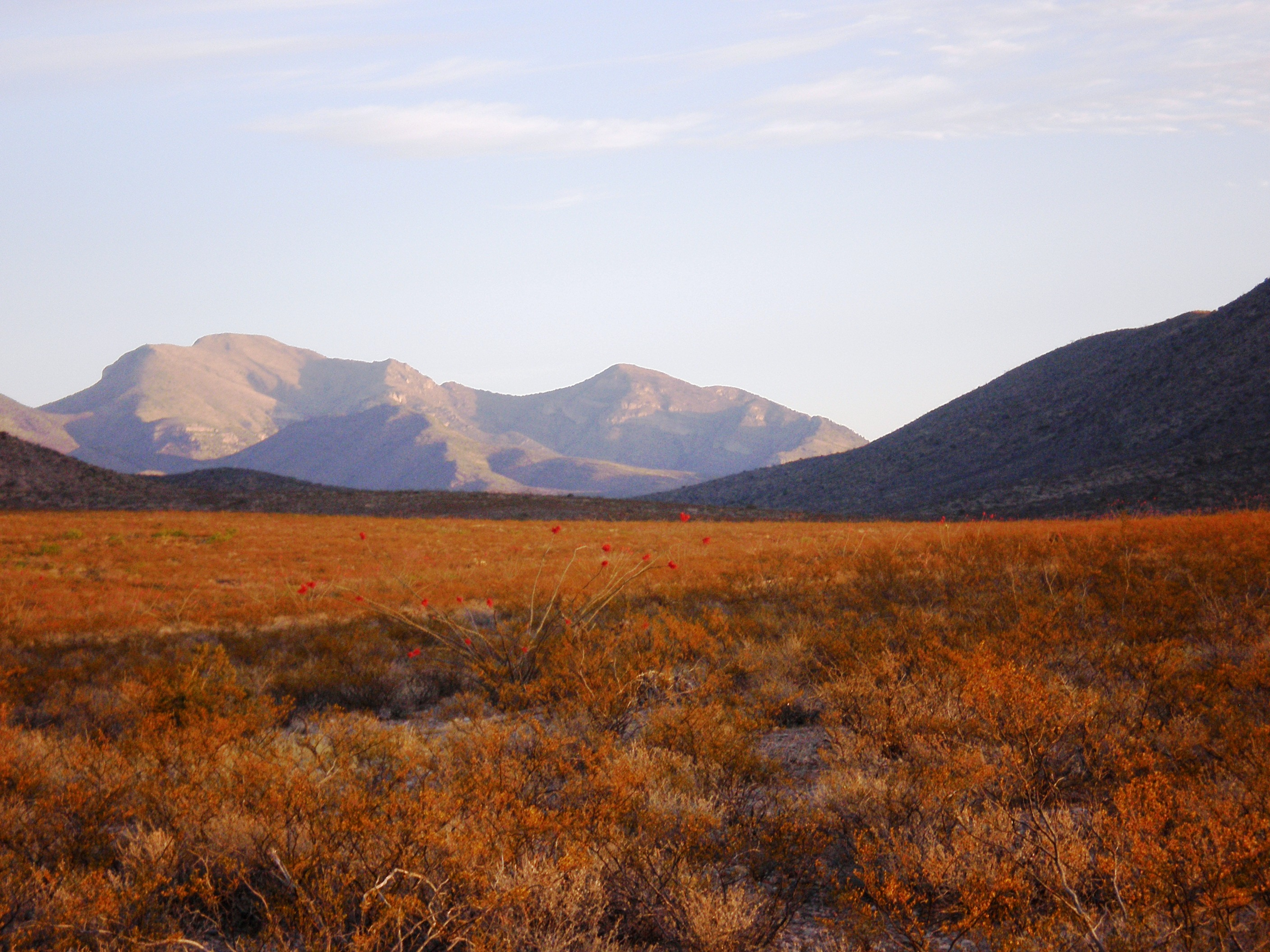
Sunrise on the Hatchet Mountains viewed from the southeast, on the CDT

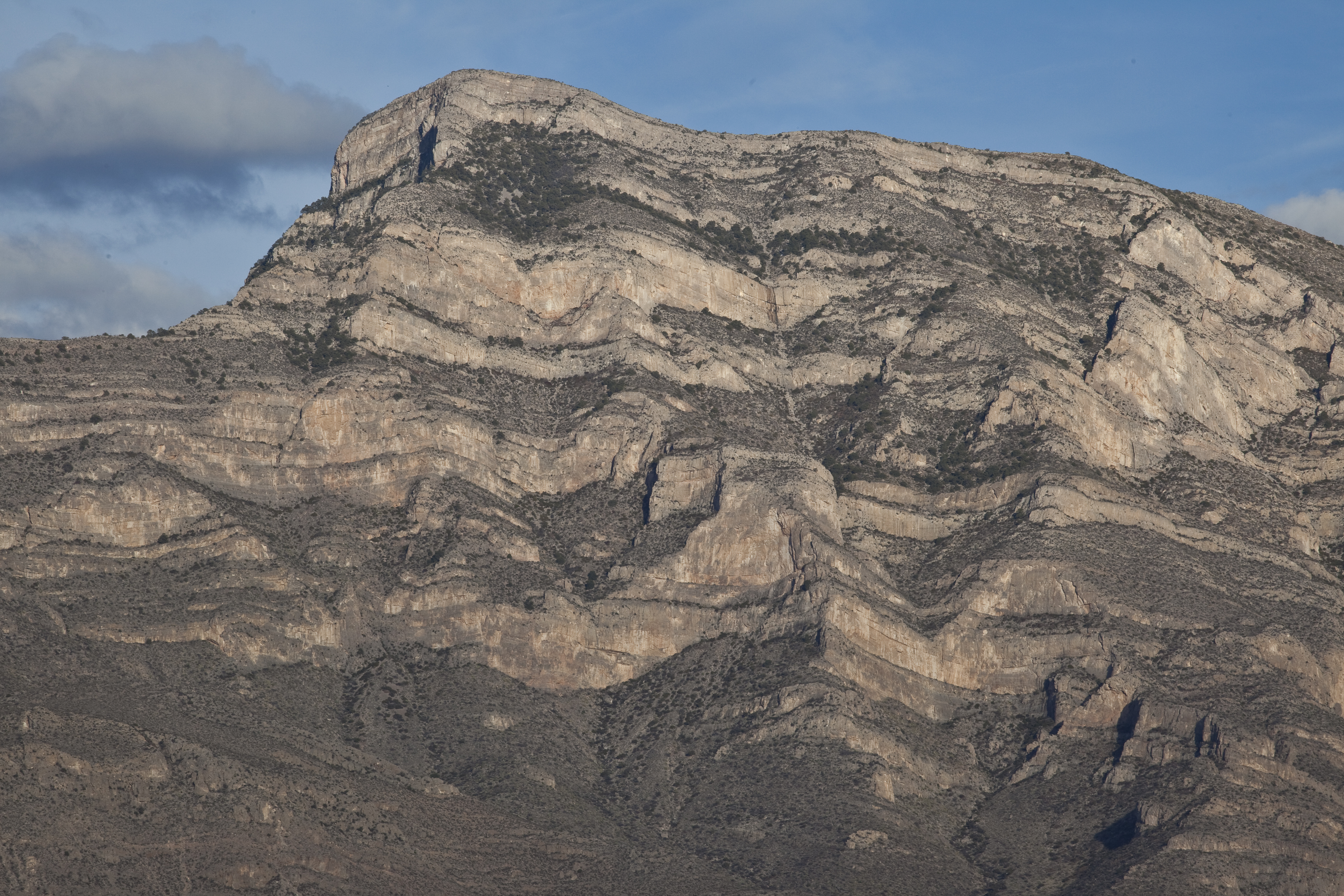
Example of the complex geology in the range from the Big Hatchet Mountains Wilderness Study Area
