= Whitmire Ranch =

Coordinates: 31°49′43″N 108°34′38″W

Whitmire Ranch is a locale in Hidalgo County, New Mexico. The ranch was named after its owner, J. B. Whitmire, a rancher in the 1880s. Its headquarters was located nearby Whitmire Spring on the western shore near the center of Playas Lake.

== History ==
The vicinity of Playas Lake was not settled by Americans until near the end of the Apache Wars, although what became known as Whitmire Spring was used as a watering spot and camp by the expedition of Lt. Col. Philip St. George Cooke and the Mormon Battalion from November 23–24, 1846. The expedition's route became known as Cooke's Wagon Road, and was part of the southern route of the 49ers to California during the California Gold Rush. After the early 1850s this part of Cooke's route was abandoned for the shorter Tucson Cutoff as the main route of east-west travel. Toward the end of the Apache Wars, during the 1880s J. B. Whitmire was the first settler at the springs and made them the site of his ranch house until he sold out.
