= Little Hatchet Mountains =

Mountain range in New Mexico, USA

Little Hatchet Mountains is a mountain range in Hidalgo and Grant Counties, New Mexico. The range trends north and south between Hatchita Valley to the east and Playas Valley to the west. Its tallest height is Hatchita Peak located at 31°50′30″N 108°27′09″W at an elevation of 6,611 feet / 2,015 meters in Hidalgo County.
