= Playas Valley =

Valley in New Mexico

- Location within New Mexico
- Length: 60 mi (97 km) N-S
- Width: 15 mi (24 km) E-W

Geography
- Country: United States
- States: New Mexico; Sonora
- Regions: New Mexico Bootheel; Chihuahuan Desert
- District: Hidalgo County, NM
- Population center: Playas, NM
- Borders on: Continental Divide; Animas Mountains; Little; Big Hatchet Mountains
- Coordinates: 31°52′58″N 108°35′20″W
- Interactive map of Playas Valley

The Playas Valley is a lengthy and narrow 60-mi (97-km) long, valley located in Hidalgo County, New Mexico in the Bootheel Region; the extreme south of the valley lies in Chihuahua. Playas, New Mexico is located in the northeast. The valley is noteworthy for the Playas Lake, a dry lake in the north.

The Continental Divide of the Americas forms its western border in a series of three linear mountain ranges, and the divide forms the water divide as the northern border of the Playas Valley. The valley disappears southward into regions of the northwest Chihuahuan Desert of Chihuahua, Mexico. Regions of the desert extend northward to foothills of various mountain ranges, canyons, washes, or other landforms.

== Description ==
The Playas Valley is linear, and north–south trending and surrounded by mountain ranges, except on the south, where the flatlands merge into the Chihuahuan Desert.

West

- Pyramid Mountains
- Animas Mountains
- San Luis Mountains

East

- Little Hatchet Mountains
- Big Hatchet Mountains
- Alamo Hueco Mountains

=== Playas Lake and the valley ===
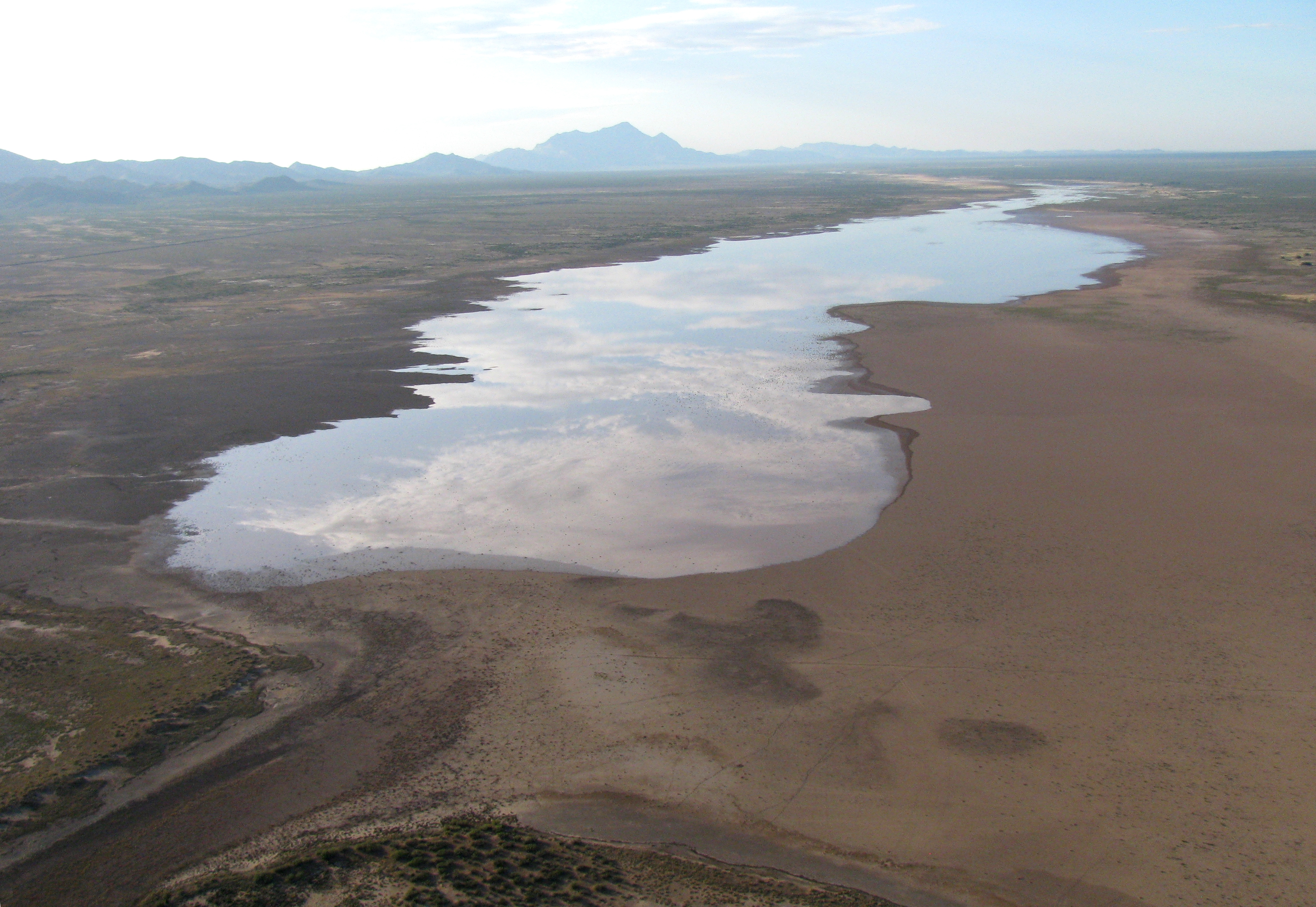
The normally dry Playas Lake holds water after the monsoon season

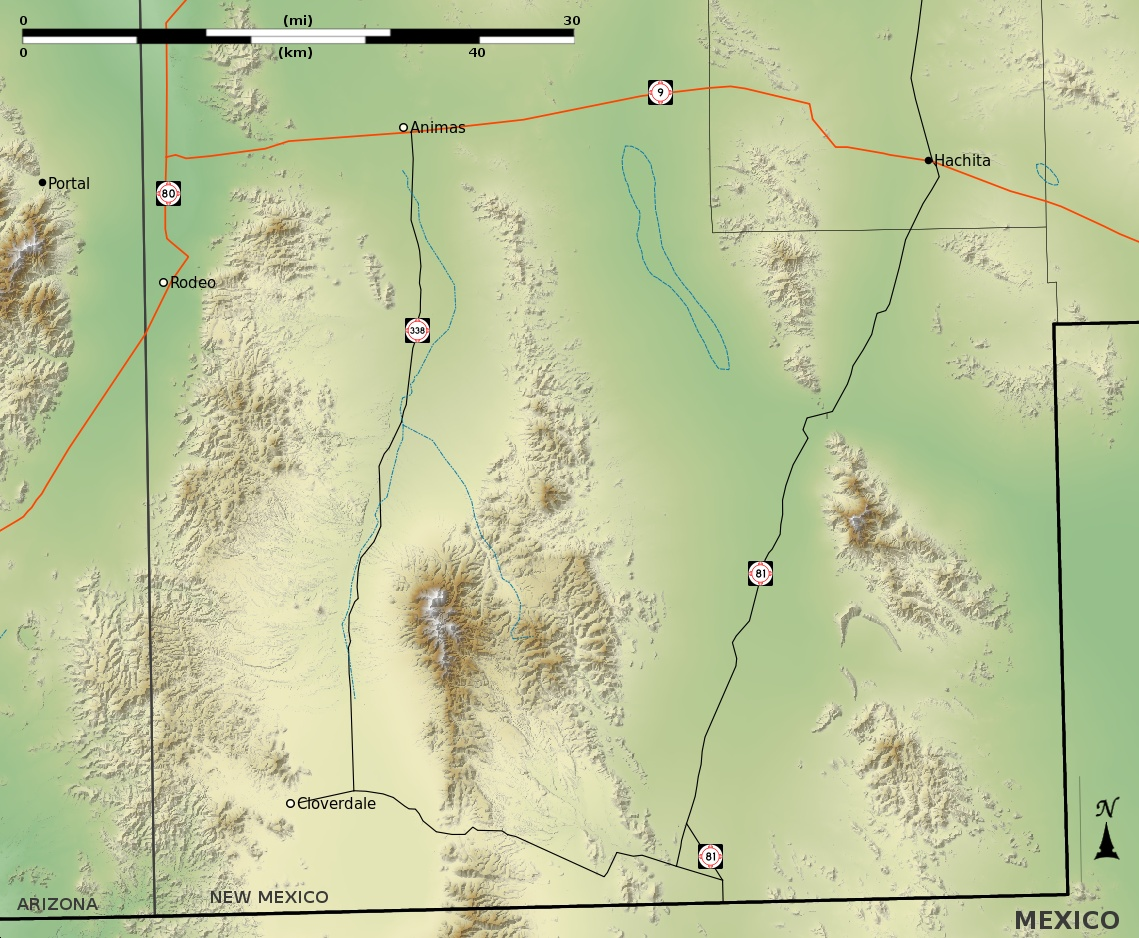
Three valleys of the New Mexico Bootheel: Animas, left; Playas, center; and Hachita Valley, northeast.

Much of the drainage into Playas Valley does not end in a playa or dry lake. In the southern half to two thirds of the valley, the valley has mostly dry washes that do not reach the valley flatlands.

Playas Lake is a linear dry lake, about 10 mi long, and only 4 mi west of Playas, New Mexico. An even smaller dry lake, about a tenth the size is just adjacent southwards. Both dry lakes are in the north, with the drainage coming from the continental divide as the perimeter of the valley, going north, then due west, then south as the southern ridgeline of the Pyramid Mountains. The divide makes up the southern region of the mountains, before it skirts lower peaks before reaching the north of the Animas Mountains.

Playas Lake as the lowest elevation of the north valley region is 4,278 feet (1,304 m) in elevation.
