= Animas Valley =

Valley in New Mexico, United States

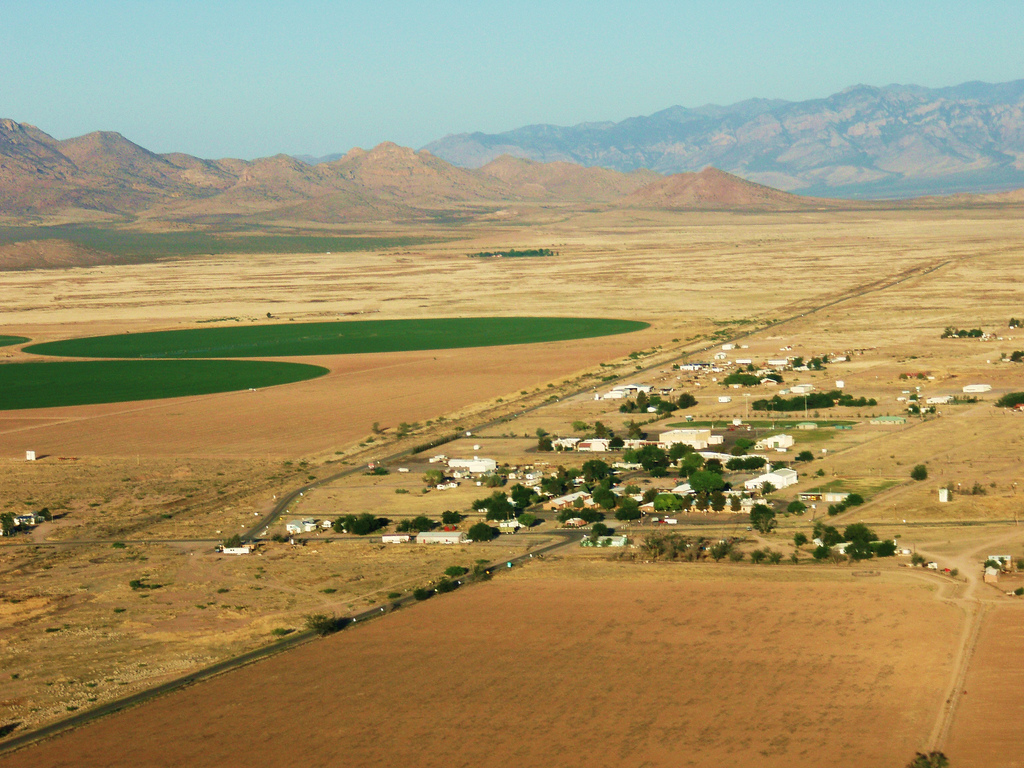
- View of Animas, New Mexico, looking west-southwest

- Location within New Mexico
- Length: 85 mi (137 km)
- Width: 15 mi (24 km)

Geography
- Country: United States
- States: New Mexico; Sonora; Chihuahua (state)
- Regions: New Mexico Bootheel; Chihuahuan Desert
- County: Hidalgo County, New Mexico
- Cities: Animas, New Mexico; Lordsburg, New Mexico
- Coordinates: 31°56′56″N 108°48′26″W
- Interactive map of Animas Valley

The Animas Valley is a lengthy and narrow north–south valley 85 miles (137 kilometres) long, located in western Hidalgo County, New Mexico, in the Bootheel Region; the extreme south of the valley lies in Sonora-Chihuahua, in the extreme north-west of the Chihuahuan Desert, the large desert region of the north-central Mexican Plateau and the Rio Grande valley and river system.

The Continental Divide of the Americas forms the valley's eastern border in a series of mountain ranges. The parallel valley eastwards on the eastern side of the Continental Divide is the slightly shorter, but also long and narrow Playas Valley.

Westwards of the narrow, lengthy and divided Peloncillo Mountains, are the two valleys in Arizona, the San Simon and San Bernardino Valleys, both east of the massif of the Chiricahua Mountains and associated mountain ranges, which anchor the eastern half of Cochise County. Parts of this entire region with its mountain ridgelines, and mountaintops, and associated valleys are part of the sky island region called the Madrean Sky Islands of Arizona–New Mexico, and Sonora–Chihuahua, in the Sonoran and Chihuahuan Deserts.

== Description ==
The Animas Valley is linear, north–south trending, surrounded by mountain ranges, and is part of the Basin and Range Province of south-west North America. At the southern extremity of the valley straddling the United States and Mexico border lies the Pleistocene aged Lake Cloverdale The extreme north has the Lordsburg Mesa located north-west of Lordsburg and is on the northern perimeter of the Animas Valley, south of the west-flowing Gila River and the towns of Virden and Red Rock.

The valley forms a topographically closed basin. At the southern end is the usually dry Lake Cloverdale, also known as Animas Flats, which extends slightly into Mexico. Some groundwater may feed the Gila River.
