= Animas Mountains =

Mountain range in southwestern New Mexico, United States

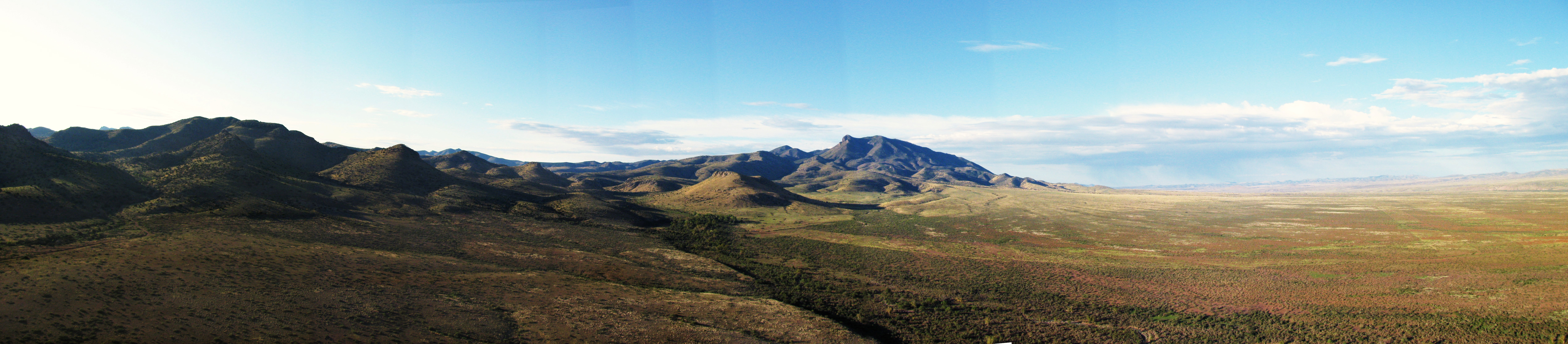
- north end of massif of Animas Mountains view southeastwards, from Animas, NM in Animas Valley

Highest point
- Peak: Animas Peak
- Elevation: 8,565 ft (2,611 m)
- Coordinates: 31°34′10″N 108°47′19″W

Dimensions
- Length: 30 mi (48 km) N-S
- Width: 12 mi (19 km)

Geography
- Location within New Mexico
- Country: United States
- State: New Mexico
- District: Hidalgo County, NM
- Borders on: Animas Valley-W; Playas Valley-E; Pyramid Mountains-N; Peloncillo Mountains-W

The Animas Mountains are a small mountain range in Hidalgo County, within the "Boot-Heel" region of far southwestern New Mexico, in the United States.

== Location ==
They extend north–south for about 30 miles (50 km) along the Continental Divide, from near the town of Animas to a few miles north of the border with Mexico. The range is about 12 miles (20 km) wide at its widest. The highest point of the range is the southern summit of the mile-long Animas Peak massif, 8,565 feet (2,611 m). (Animas Peak itself is the slightly lower north summit, 8,531 ft/2,600 m.) The Animas Mountains lie between the Animas Valley on the west and the Playas Valley on the east. Nearby ranges include the Peloncillo Mountains (Hidalgo County), across the Animas Valley, and the Big Hatchet and Little Hatchet Mountains, across the Playas Valley.

== Geography ==
Physiographically, the range divides into two parts. The compact southern part, which includes Animas Peak, is higher and wider, rising up to 4,000 ft (1,200 m) above the nearby valleys. It has a sky island character, with dense coniferous forests at the higher elevations. The longer, narrow northern portion is lower, reaching only 7,310 ft (2,230 m) at Gillespie Peak, and is characterized by grassland and piñon-juniper woods and shrubs. The Animas Mountains lie near the Chihuahuan Desert, the Sonoran Desert, the Sierra Madre Occidental of Mexico, and the mountains surrounding the headwaters of the Gila River. Biotic influences from these regions, as well as the more distant Rocky Mountains, give the southern portion of the range a great diversity of species, including "approximately 130 species of birds, 60 species of mammals, and 40 species of reptiles."

== History and current management ==
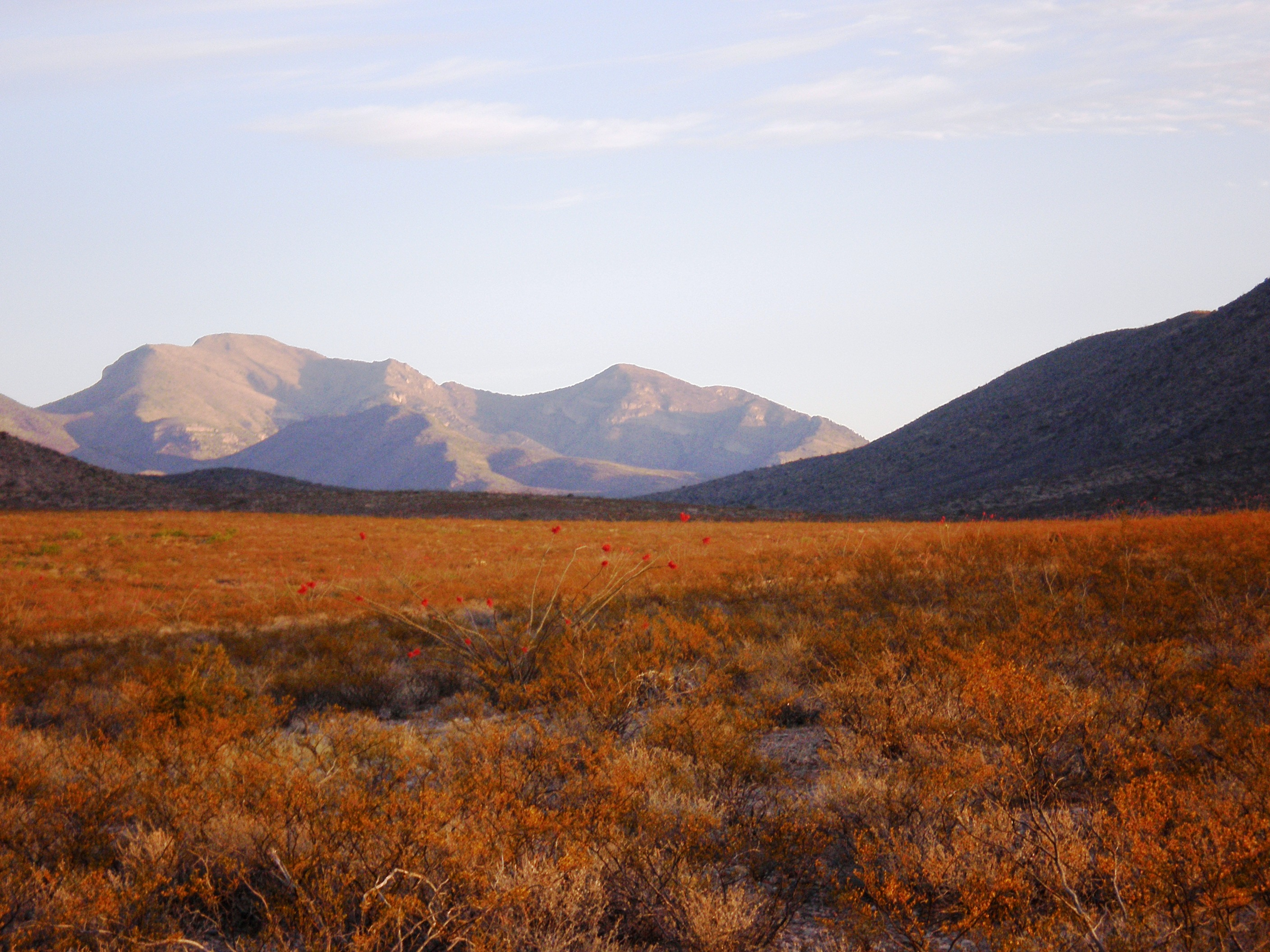
Sunrise view of the Hatchet Mountains from the Continental Divide Trail near its southern terminus at Crazy Cook

Most of the range is encompassed in the Diamond A Ranch (formerly the Gray Ranch), which is owned and managed by the Animas Foundation. The 321,000 acre (1,299 km^{2}) ranch (more than one third the size of the state of Rhode Island - 3140 km2) was bought in 1990 by The Nature Conservancy, which took the unusual step of selling it in the mid-1990s to the Animas Foundation, a private organization founded by poet and rancher Drummond Hadley and funded in part by the Anheuser-Busch family. The Foundation is intended to practice "sustainable agriculture in harmony with the environment." The Animas Foundation is one cooperating landowner within the Malpai Borderlands Group, a collaborative group in the region involving local landowners, local, state and federal agencies, universities, and environmental organizations. "The Animas Foundation is particularly important to the group in that they own more than a third of the planning area."

Access to the ranch, and hence to portions of the Animas Mountains, is tightly controlled, with little or no public recreational use opportunities. As a result, the Continental Divide Trail had to be rerouted from the true Continental Divide near Antelope Wells, New Mexico to the current, official beginning of the CDT at Crazy Cook in the Big Hatchet Mountains.
