= Guadalupe Canyon massacre =

1881 ambush in Arizona

Coordinates: 31°20′22″N 109°05′33″W

The Guadalupe Canyon Massacre was an incident that occurred on August 13, 1881, in the Guadalupe Canyon area of the southern Peloncillo Mountains – Guadalupe Mountains. Five American men were killed in an ambush, including "Old Man" Clanton, the alleged leader. They most likely belonged to The Cowboys, an outlaw group based in Pima and Cochise counties in Arizona. Two men survived the attack. The canyon straddles the modern Arizona and New Mexico state line and connects the Animas Valley of New Mexico with the San Bernardino Valley of Arizona. During the American Old West, the canyon was a key route for smugglers into and out of Mexico.

The two survivors said they had been attacked by Mexicans. Historians generally believe that the smugglers were killed by Mexican military forces patrolling the border to try to reduce smuggling. Some sources repeat the assertion of attorney William McLaury, who was part of the prosecution related to the 1881 gunfight at the O.K. Corral, in which two of his brothers had been killed. He wrote that Wyatt Earp and his two brothers had killed Clanton and his associates, and this has been repeated in some sources.

== Background ==
The Cowboys were a large group of loosely associated American outlaws based in Pima and Cochise counties in Arizona. Various members had on multiple occasions crossed the border into Mexico where they stole cattle; they drove them across the border to sell them in the United States, especially for meat to the booming mining camps. The Mexican government at the time placed high tariffs on goods transported across the border, resulting in smuggling being a profitable enterprise.

In July 1881, several Mexican smugglers heading for Tucson or Tombstone and carrying silver were ambushed and killed in an area called Skeleton Canyon. The killers were never positively identified, but Mexicans just across the border always suspected that those murders were committed by outlaw Cowboys.

A ranch owned by "Old Man" Clanton in the Animas Valley in New Mexico was used at times by the Cowboys as a way station for selling the stolen cattle. Old Man Clanton was suspected of also participating in the smuggling. Although his ranch did not own a brand, which was required for cattle operations, it was one of the most profitable cattle ranches in that part of the country.

== Ambush ==
In August 1881, Mexican Commandant Felipe Neri dispatched troops to the border. The Mexicans found "Old Man" Clanton and six others bedded down for the night in Guadalupe Canyon with a herd of cattle. The Mexicans waited until dawn to attack the group, killing five of the Cowboys. Some researchers theorize that Mexican Rurales, led by Captain Alfredo Carrillo, who had survived the Skeleton Canyon Massacre in 1879, led the ambush of the Cowboys.

The dead included Old Man Clanton; Charley Snow, a ranch hand who heard a noise and was the first killed; Jim Crane, who was wanted for a March 1881 stagecoach robbery near Tombstone, during which two men had been murdered; Dick Gray, son of Col. Mike Gray; and Billy Lang, a cattle rancher. Crane and Gray were either still in their bedrolls or getting dressed when killed. Clanton was cooking breakfast for the camp when shot and he fell dead into the cookfire. Lang was the only one who had a chance to fight back. One man was wounded: Harry Ernshaw, a milk farmer, was grazed by a bullet on the nose. Billy Byers feigned death until the attackers left.

Ernshaw found his way to the ranch of John Pleasant Gray (Dick's brother), who enlisted help from a mining camp 20 miles (32 km) away. When the group returned to Guadalupe Canyon, they found the dead men stripped naked. They finally found a dazed Billy Byers five miles away. Snow was buried where he fell due to decomposition. The other bodies were taken back by wagon and buried about ten miles east of Cloverdale, New Mexico. In 1882 Ike and Phin Clanton exhumed their father's body and moved it to the Boot Hill cemetery in Tombstone, Arizona. He was re-interred alongside his son Billy Clanton, who had been killed two months after his father, in the Gunfight at the O.K. Corral.

== Identity of the attackers ==
Survivors Ernshaw and Byers claimed that the attackers were Mexican, and repeated that Dick Gray had said this, too, before he was killed. Ike and Phin Clanton later sent the Byers family a photograph of their father; across the back they had written, "Mr. Clanton killed on Aug 13 – 81 by Mexicans with 4 other Americans in Guadalupe Canon [sic] New Mexico." Both men signed the statement. A contemporary photograph of Will G. Lang bears a similar inscription: "Will G. Lang killed by Mexicans – Animas Valley New Mexico Aug 13, 1881 together with Gray, Crane, Clanton and Snow and Byers wounded."

Rumors surfaced later in 1881 that Virgil, Morgan, and Wyatt Earp had killed Old Man Clanton. The first known account is in a letter from attorney William R. McLaury to his brother-in-law, David D. Appelgate on November 19, 1881. McLaury was passionately convinced that the Earps and Doc Holliday had murdered his younger brothers Frank and Tom during the Gunfight at the O.K. Corral. He was a member of the prosecution team that was presenting evidence during the preliminary hearing on the event before Judge Wells Spicer that month. The rumor of the Earps' involvement has been repeated in a number of publications based solely on William McLaury's assertion.
