= Black Jack Christian =

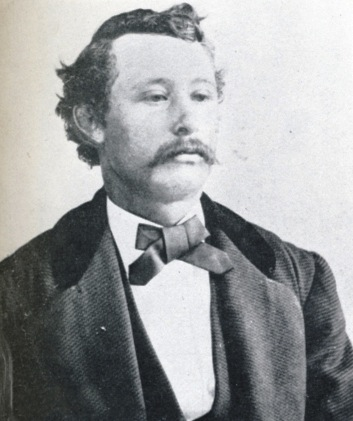
- Born: William Christian; September 5, 1871; Kearney, Missouri, U.S.
- Died: April 28, 1897 (aged 25); Skeleton Canyon, Arizona Territory, U.S.
- Cause of death: Gunshot
- Other names: 202, Ed Williams
- Occupation: Criminal
- Years active: 1889–1897
- Known for: Bank robberies

Black Jack Christian, aka 202, or Ed Williams, (September 5, 1871 – April 28, 1897) was an outlaw of the Old West. He was a leader of a group known as the High Fives Gang, which operated mostly in New Mexico Territory.

== Early life ==
He was born William Christian, in Fort Griffin, Texas, in 1871 and had a brother Bob. Very little is known about his youth and early life. He and Bob migrated into the Southwest, where they pursued both legal and illegal activities, including cattle rustling.

== Outlaws ==
Black Jack was documented in reports of outlaw activity in the late 1880s, along with his brother Bob Christian. He first earned the nickname "202" due to his large frame. However, he quickly became better known as "Black Jack" due to his tendency to have a short temper. During this time of the late 1880s and early 1890s, he and his brother Bob organized the "High Fives Gang", operating mostly around New Mexico Territory.

In 1895, while the two brothers were in Guthrie, Oklahoma, they shot and killed a lawman, and were arrested. They escaped with the assistance of their gang and fled to Arizona Territory.

The following year, with the help of a wealthy rancher associate, on August 6, 1896, the gang robbed the "International Bank" in Nogales, Arizona. During their escape from town, gang member Jess Williams was shot and wounded by newspaperman Frank King, causing him to drop the money taken during the robbery; he also managed to drop his one and only gun earring he wore in his left ear. Williams, both Christian brothers, and gang member Bob Hays were able to escape town. Christian split up from the rest of the gang after they traveled east a ways.

Sheriff Bob Leatherwood of Tucson, Arizona pursued members of the gang with a posse. While approaching Skeleton Canyon, they were fired upon by some of the High Fives, immediately killing Special Deputy Frank Robson, who was riding in front. After a shootout, where the posse was never close enough to see the gang members, the three men escaped, riding into Mexico. They intended to hide out there for a time, hoping that lawmen would eventually stop their pursuit.

In 1897, the gang returned to Arizona, with Black Jack joining them. They committed several stagecoach robberies. A posse located them in a small canyon, and ambushed them, killing the four members of the gang who were traveling together. Their bodies were hauled back to town atop a lumber wagon and put on display. The canyon was named after Black Jack Christian and is known locally as "Black Jack Canyon".
