= Guadalupe Mountains (Hidalgo County) =

Mountain range in southwest New Mexico

Guadaleupe Mountains
- Location within New Mexico

Highest point
- Peak: Guadalupe Mountain
- Elevation: 6,450 ft (1,970 m)
- Coordinates: 31°28′03″N 109°02′05″W

Dimensions
- Length: 13 mi (21 km) N-S
- Width: 9 mi (14 km)

Geography
- Country: United States
- States: New Mexico, Arizona and Sonora
- Regions: New Mexico Bootheel, Sonoran Desert and Chihuahuan Desert
- County: Hidalgo
- Settlements: Gray Ranch, Agua Prieta and Douglas
- Range coordinates: 31°25′46″N 109°02′39″W
- Borders on: Peloncillo Mountains, Animas Valley, Sonoran Desert, Chihuahuan Desert and San Bernardino Valley

The Guadalupe Mountains of Hidalgo County (Spanish: Sierra de Guadalupe) are a 13 mi (21 km) long, sub-range in southwest Hidalgo County, New Mexico, United States, adjacent to the southeast border of Arizona's Cochise County. A small portion of the range is in Cochise County, namely the outlet of Guadalupe Canyon, famous for the Guadalupe Canyon Massacre. The southernmost end of the range is also in the border region of Sonora, just north of Federal Highway 2.

The Guadalupe Mountains are on the southern end of the extensive north–south Peloncillo Mountains, that abut the Arizona border.

== Range description ==
The Guadalupe Mountains are a short sub-range, and about 13 mi long, north to south. The range narrows southwards, with Guadalupe Canyon in the center-west of the south section, and Guadalupe Creek traversing due south. The canyon then turns due west to have its outlet in Arizona.

The north end of the range contains the highpoint of Guadalupe Mountain in the center west. It is the origin of Guadalupe Creek's headwaters flowing due southeast and south; directly northwest, north, and east of Guadalupe Mountain are the headwaters of Cloverdale Creek.

=== Highpoints ===
The highest peak in the range, Guadalupe Mountain, 6,450 feet (1,966 m), is at the north-center of the range, and slightly west; the peak is located at 31.467602°N 109.034777°W. Guadalupe Spring is on its south, part of the headwaters of Guadalupe Creek-Guadalupe Canyon; to the east are the headwaters of Cloverdale Creek, which flows eastwards towards the ghost town site of Cloverdale.

At the center west of the range, adjacent the Arizona border, lies Bunk Robinson Peak, at 6,241 feet (1,902 m).

== See also ==
- Guadalupe Canyon Massacre
- Guadalupe Mountains National Park
