= Boot Heel volcanic field =

Landform in Mexico and United States

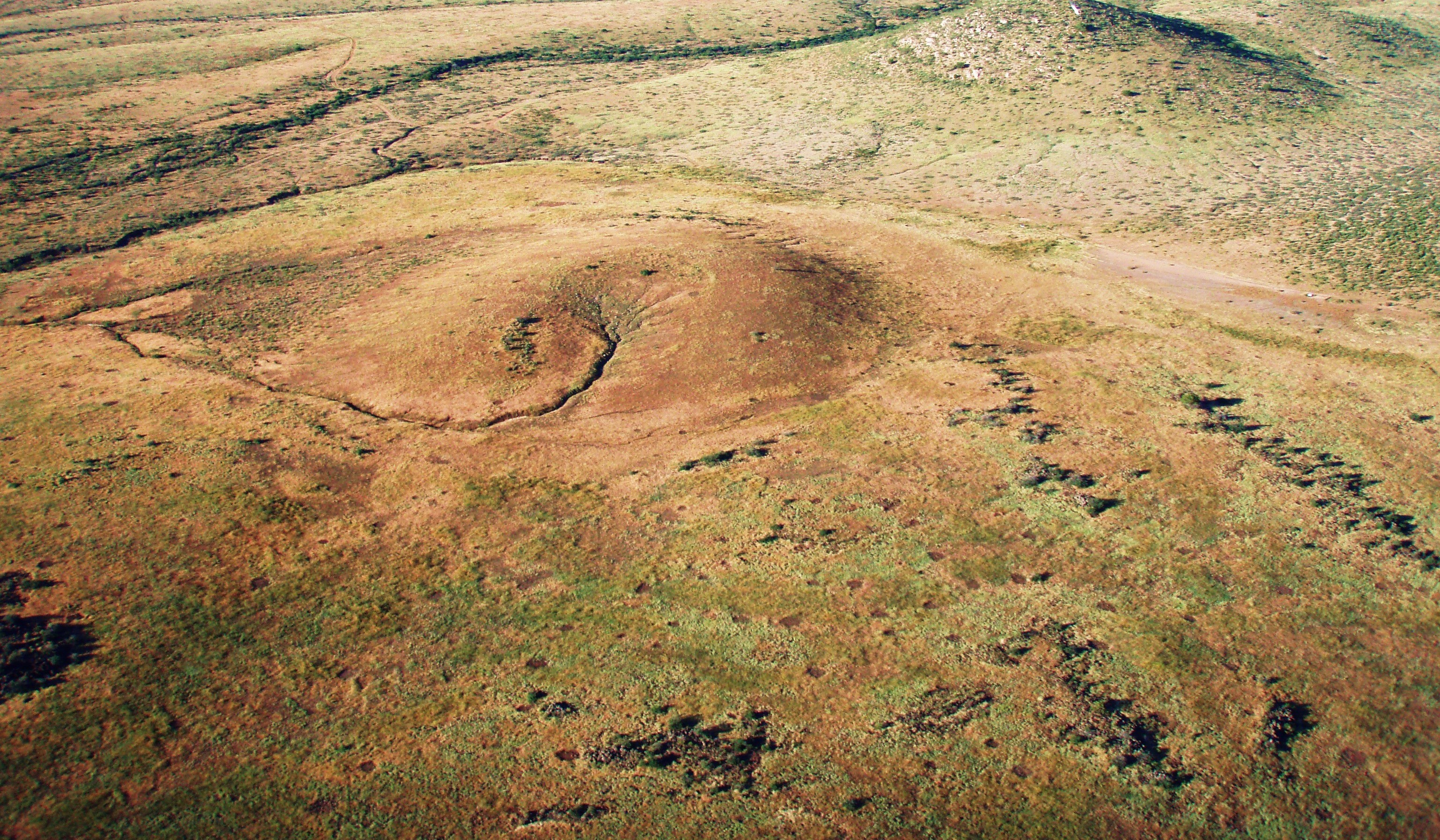
- Volcanic vent at the head of the lava flow west of Animas, New Mexico at the base of the Peloncillo Mountains.

Highest point
- Elevation: 2,300 m (7,500 ft)
- Coordinates: 32°30′N 109°15′W

Geography
- Location: Mexico–United States border

Geology
- Rock age: 3.2 to 0.3 million years
- Mountain type: volcanic field

The Boot Heel volcanic field is located in the Bootheel region of southwest New Mexico, adjacent areas of southeastern Arizona, and northwest Mexico. The field covers an area of more than 24,000 km^{2}. The field includes nine volcanic calderas ranging in age from 26.9 to 35.3 Ma. Extrusive products include rhyolitic ignimbrites along with basalt, andesite, and rhyolite lava flows. The major ash flow tuff sheets produced, range in volume from 35 to 650 km^{3}.

Activity throughout most of the Boot Heel volcanic field paused between 33 and 28 million years ago. The earlier pulse of activity involved less evolved magmas, while the later pulse was relatively depleted in volatiles. The pause in activity has been interpreted as a period of tectonic reorganization along the west coast of North America, including the birth of the San Andreas Fault, that temporarily shifted volcanism to the east.

The field includes the Geronimo-Animas volcanic field and the Palomas volcanic field.

== Geronimo volcanic field ==
The Geronimo volcanic field (also known as the San Bernardino volcanic field) is a monogenetic volcanic field and a sub-section of the Boot Heel volcanic field in southeastern Arizona, US.

== Calderas ==
The calderas of the Boot Heel field and their associated ignimbrites include:

- Pyramid Mountains
  - Muir caldera 35.3 Ma (tuff of Woodhall Canyon)
- Peloncillo Mountains
  - Steins caldera 34.4 Ma (tuff of Steins)
- Animas Mountains
  - Juniper caldera 33.5 Ma (Oak Creek Tuff)
  - Animas Peak caldera 33.5 Ma (tuff of Black Bill Canyon)
  - Tullous caldera 35.1 Ma (Bluff Creek Tuff)
- Chiricahua Mountains
  - Geronimo Trail caldera 32.7 Ma (Gillespie Tuff)
  - Clanton Draw caldera 27.4 Ma (Park Tuff)
  - Portal caldera 27.6 Ma (tuff of Horseshoe Canyon)
  - Turkey Creek caldera 26.9 Ma (Rhyolite Canyon Tuff)

== See also ==
- List of volcanoes in the United States
- List of volcanic fields
- Chiricahua National Monument
- Peloncillo Mountains (Hidalgo County)
- Peloncillo Mountains (Cochise County)
