= Black Draw =

Landform in the San Bernardino Valley of Cochise County, Arizona

Black Draw is a valley, and tributary stream within the San Bernardino Valley of Cochise County, Arizona. Its waters are a tributary of the San Bernardino River and its mouth lies at an elevation of 3,753 feet / 1,144 meters. Its source is at an elevation of 4,740 feet, at 31°34′17″N 109°10′12″W on the northwest slope of Paramore Crater in the upper San Bernardino Valley.
