= Skeleton Canyon shootout =

1896 bank robbery gunfight near Nogales, Arizona

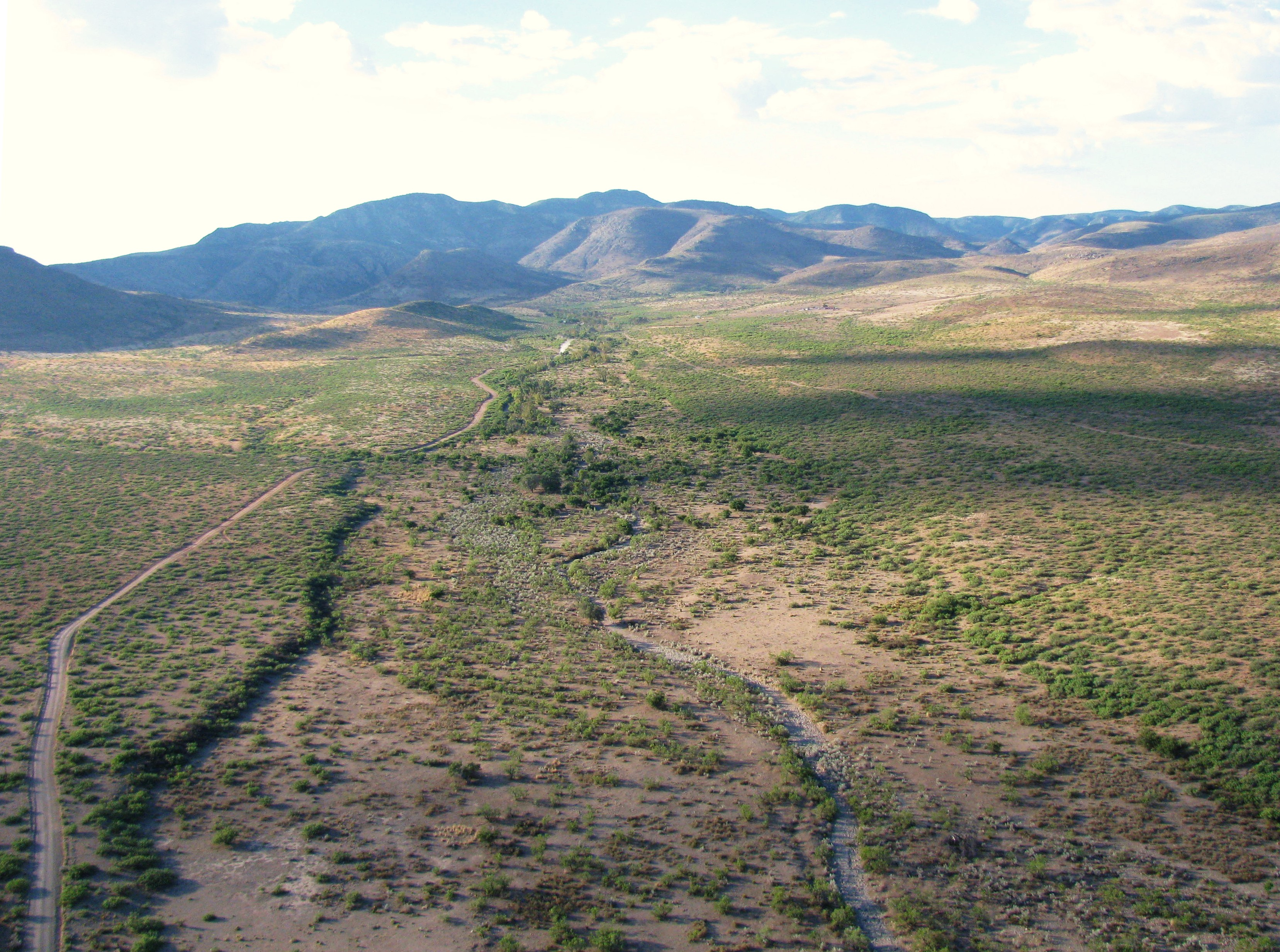
- A low-level aerial view of the Peloncillo Mountains and Skeleton Creek, which leads to the entrance of Skeleton Canyon
- Date: August 12, 1896
- Location: Skeleton Canyon, Arizona Territory, United States
- Outcome: Outlaws escape
- Deaths: 1
- Injuries: 1–3

This event should not be confused with the Skeleton Canyon Massacres of 1879 and 1881.

The Skeleton Canyon shootout was a gunfight on August 12, 1896, between members of the High Fives Gang and a posse of American lawmen. Following a failed robbery on August 1 of the bank in Nogales, Arizona, the High Fives headed east and split up. The gang's leader, Black Jack Christian, and George Musgrave got away.

Three others, including Bob Christian, were engaged by the posse at the entrance of Skeleton Canyon. This gorge in the Peloncillo Mountains had historically been used by smugglers, bandits, and legitimate travelers between the United States and Mexico. The outlaws fought off their pursuers, killing Frank Robson, and escaped into New Mexico Territory.

Pursuit continued through the month, as Black Jack and Musgrave surfaced in other areas, as did the other three. Other men joined the posse, and the United States Marshal of New Mexico Territory acquired aid from United States Army forces already in the area for the Apache Campaign in the Peloncillos. The pursuers did not catch up with the bandits for many months.

== Background ==
Black Jack Christian and his older brother Bob were leaders of the outlaw High Five Gang, but at least six other men rode with them at times, including Bob Hayes, George West Musgrave, Van Musgrave, Code Young, Sid Moore, and "Three Fingered" Jack Dunlop. After working as cowboys in Arizona, on July 20, 1896, the High Fives held up a general store in Separ, New Mexico. They made off with around $200 and some merchandise, trading some of their loot to local ranchers for food and lodging.

By August 1, 1896, the High Fives were holed up on the Babocomari grant, in the San Pedro Valley north of Fort Huachuca, Arizona. Together with Ed Roberts, a wealthy rancher and associate of Musgrave, they planned to rob the International Bank of Nogales in Arizona, located near the international border. Roberts was to arrange to withdraw $10,000 in specie and bills, purportedly to pay the unpopular tariff for importing some Mexican cattle. But, Roberts intended to have the High Fives steal the money.

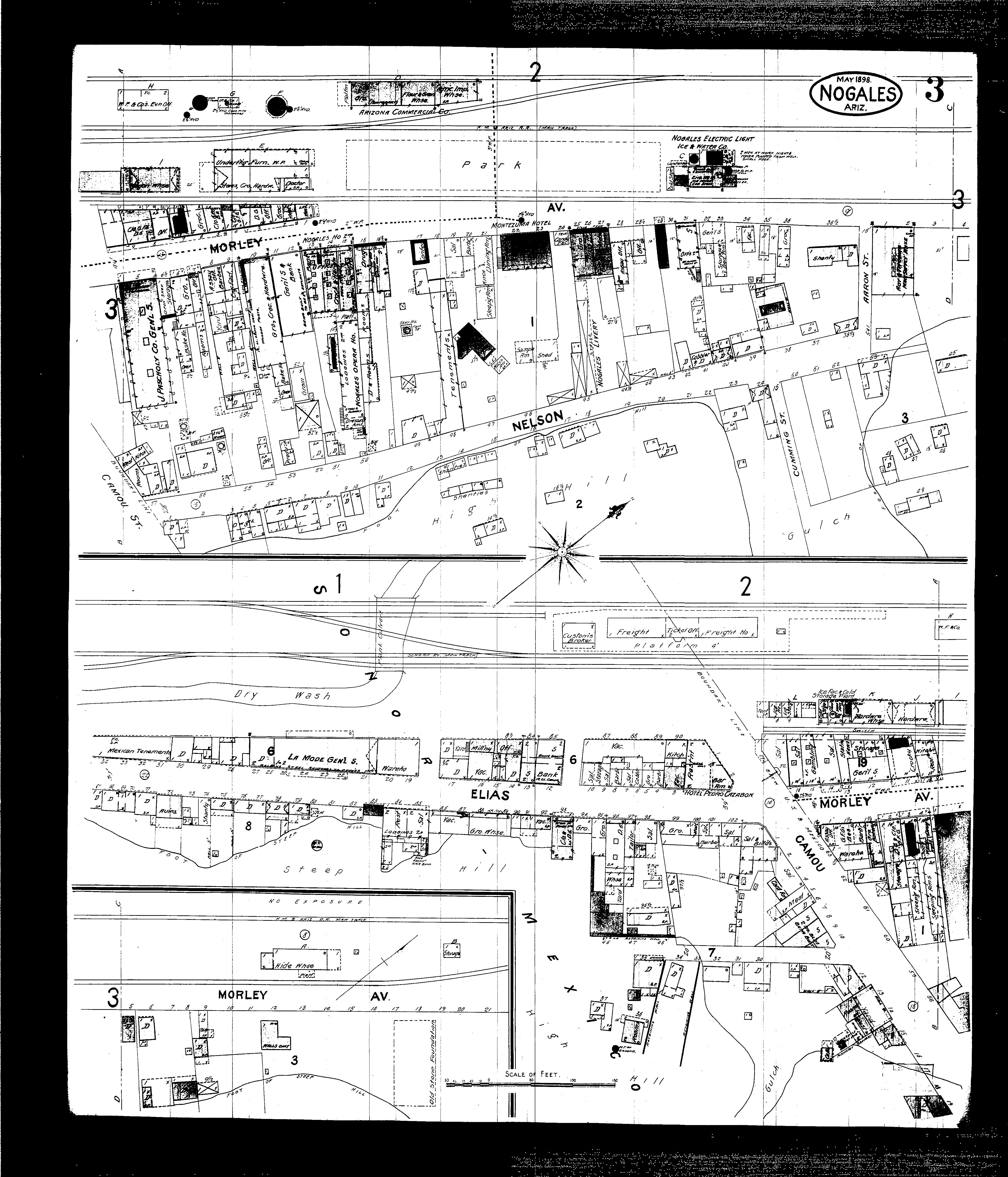
A map of Nogales, Arizona, in May 1898. The International Bank of Nogales is at the left of the upper map and the Nogales Electric, Light, Ice and Water Company is at the right.

The bank was in a two-story building that also held stores for groceries and hardware. On August 6, the clerks in the bank prepared the cash and coins for Roberts' large withdrawal, scheduled to take place at 1:00 pm. The bank's president, John Dessart, had the money taken out of the vault and stacked on the counter in preparation.

Sometime after 12:00 pm, the High Fives entered town, riding next to the railroad down Morley Avenue and toward the bank. At lunchtime, it was quiet. Black Jack, George Musgrave, and Bob Hayes dismounted and went inside, while Bob Christian and Code Young remained outside to watch the horses. Another source says that Three Fingered Jack was the fifth man in the robbery, rather than Code Young.

Inside the bank, the cashier, Major Fred Herrera, sat behind the counter while John Dessart stood at a desk working on balances. Hayes covered the cashier, Black Jack watched Dessart, and Musgrave moved behind the counter with a sack for the loot. Herrera handed stacks of cash over the counter to Dessart, who filled the bag. Musgrave walked to the rear to check it out. Through a double door, he saw four men meeting in the bank's parlor; Morgan R. Wise, a consular agent; W.L. Campbell of Calabasas, Robert Ekey, a Santa Cruz County rancher; and Judge Ed Williams, Ekey's attorney. About then, Major A.O. Brummel entered the bank to join the meeting; Musgrave seized him and moved him toward the back, but this activity distracted Black Jack, and Dessart ran out the front door.

Black Jack struck and wounded Dessart in the head with his rifle, but the president reached the exterior, running and calling to Herry Lewis on the street, to telephone the police. Black Jack threatened Lewis with his pistol and prevented him from calling anyone.

Distracted, Musgrave and Hayes lost control of the men in the parlor, and the five escaped out the back door of the bank. Major Fred Herrera got his pistol from under the counter and fired it at Hayes. Running through the front door, Hayes bumped into Black Jack. Herrera also shot at Musgrave, hitting him in the knee as he ran out the back. The bandit passed through the hardware store to join his gang in front. As they mounted up, Frank King, a deputy customs inspector, opened fire from across the street, wounding both Musgrave's and Black Jack's horses. Black Jack pulled Musgrave up behind him, and the High Fives took off on four horses, with Musgrave's riderless horse trailing closely.

As they passed the Montezuma Hotel, a Treasury Department inspector named Ben E. Hambleton grabbed a rifle and mounted a horse to pursue. Passing the Nogales Electric, Light, Ice and Water Company building, the gang was fired on by two employees. At the end of town, they were fired on by two other Nogales residents. The "bullet marks scarred much of downtown Nogales," but the only fatalities were animals: a horse hit by Black Jack and a mule by Major Herrera.

Diego Ramirez of Nogales said that the High Fives made off with $40,000; however, Johnny Clarke, the son of a posse member who pursued the outlaws to Skeleton Canyon, said that "it was never known if they got away with the money or not." According to the Tanners, the gang did not gain $40,000, or even the $10,000 that was arranged. The newspapers of both Nogales, Arizona, and Nogales, Mexico reported that "not a cent was lost."

Just outside town, the outlaws rode east up Beck Canyon, where they split up. Black Jack and Musgrave went to Ed Roberts' ranch, located on the upper San Pedro River. Bob Christian, Bob Hayes and Code Young crossed the border into Sonora, near the San Antonio Pass in the Patagonia Mountains. They were pursued by a posse from Nogales, led by Customs Collector Samuel F. Webb, but the lawmen eventually abandoned the pursuit several days later on August 8. From the border town of Lochiel, the posse had traveled fifteen miles into Sonora, but finally had to turn back because they lacked fresh mounts.

== Posse pursuit and shootout ==
When news of the robbery reached Tucson, Pima County Sheriff Robert N. Leatherwood went to Bisbee, closer to the border, and organized another posse. It included deputies Broderick and Doyle, Deputy US Marshal Al Ezekiels, two customs inspectors, Samuel Webb and Miller; the noted Wells Fargo agent Jeff Milton, and Billy Stiles, then a lawman but a future bandit. From Bisbee, the posse followed the High Fives' trail to where they split. At the border, Ezekiels went south with a few men, while Leatherwood followed Black Jack's trail with the main posse.

While in Mexico, Ezekiels' posse cooperated with the Gendarmería Fiscal, commanded by General Juan Fenochio. They caught up with Bob Christian, Bob Hayes and Code Young at a place called La Cuerva, but the three got away and back over the border to the US. On the morning of August 11, Sheriff Fly, and deputies Bill Hildreth, Burt Alvord and Will Johnson left Bisbee and headed east across the San Simon Valley to join up with Leatherwood. By that time, Ezekiels' posse had returned from Mexico and was also riding to rejoin Leatherwood. When Ezekiels and his men were near Mulberry Wash in San Simon Valley, Jeff Milton sighted the three bandits and wanted to engage them, but Ezekiels refused to go any further toward Mexico.

Milton later recalled:

We saw these fellows and we saw them coming out of the mulberry pasture. I says Damned if they ain't them, and the fellow in charge [Ezekiels] of them others they couldn't go. He says 'We'll run them out of the country.' And I says' that is what we want to do.' But he just quit. That was on the south end of the Chiricahuas.(sic)

After they abandoned the chase, Ezekiels' posse camped overnight in Leslie Canyon, located on the ranch of Si Bryant near the remains of Fort Rucker. On the next morning, Milton, Stiles, a man named Randolph, and Felix Mayhew left Ezekiels; they rode north through Dos Cabezas Canyon to board a train heading to Tucson. There they would get fresh horses and rejoin the pursuit.

But, the first phase of pursuit ended the same day, when Leatherwood and his forces reached Skeleton Canyon. Milton later said: "I never run on to Black Jack and I'm glad I didn't. I might have got hurt. (sic)" Skeleton Canyon is a rugged pass leading through the Peloncillos, which connects the San Simon Valley of Arizona with the Animas Valley of New Mexico. It was a well-known haven for outlaws, who used it as a fortress on more than one occasion.

At about 12:00 pm on August 12, Leatherwood's posse was riding across the valley, along Skeleton Creek, when they spotted a lone bandit ahead of them. Deputy Doyle went after the man, but, as he was riding up a steep hill, he fell off his horse, injured his knee, and broke his weapon. Unable to continue, Doyle left the posse to go to Deming.

Leatherwood, Fly, Alvord, Hildreth, Johnson, and Inspector Frank Robson stayed on the trail. At about 4:00 pm, Leatherwood and his men were near the entrance of Skeleton Canyon when suddenly "shots exploded from the underbrush seventy-five feet in front of the advancing lawmen." Riding near the front, Robson was hit twice in the first volley, both in the head, as Leatherwood and the others jumped off their horses. Robson fell dead instantly as the remaining possemen returned the fire, killing one of the bandits' horses.

Under fire, Leatherwood retreated while his horse and those of Alvord and Robson ran off toward the High Fives. One of the outlaws seized Leatherwood's horse, but it was later reported to have been shot and killed during the fight. The High Fives directed their fire at Deputy Hildreth, who was slightly wounded in the neck, and they shot and killed his horse.

Jeff Milton later recalled an account he was told of the gunfight:

Bill Hildreth got in behind a tree and they [the High Fives] were shooting and the bullets would knock the bark off on one side and then the other. And old Bob [Leatherwood] told me himself, said, 'Milton, did I run? I had one of these old long barrel rifles and I used it for a jumping stick,' when they got to shooting at him. Old Bill was the only one left then and was smoking them [the High Fives]. Do you know, I can't understand how a man can shoot at a fellow six or seven times and don't kill him. I don't understand. When old Bill got a chance to run-they [the High Fives] were shooting both sides of the tree – he got out. He remembered this fellow [Robson] and went back and got him.

Walter C. Hovey, a confidant of the gang, later said that Hildreth had tried to join the gang, which is why they retaliated by trying to kill him when he showed up with the posse. Bisbee Orb commented: "Hildreth was acting as a guide for the officers having been driving cattle in that county for years and knows all the water holes and places in the vicinity. The robbers knowing this and being acquainted with Hildreth desired to get rid of him."

The gunfight lasted until sundown and by the time it ended, the bandits had reached Robson's body. They stole his rifle, revolver, and watch before mounting up to escape into the Animas Valley. After realizing the High Fives had departed, the posse buried Robson in an unmarked grave and retreated.

== Aftermath ==
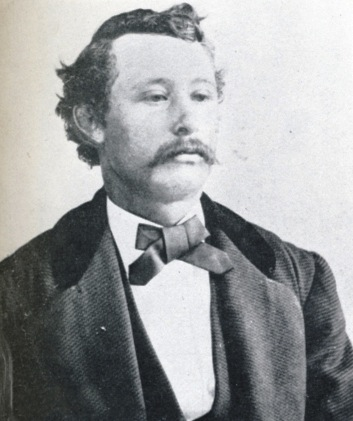
Will "Black Jack" Christian (1871–1897)

The day after the Skeleton Canyon shootout, sheriffs Fly and Leatherwood telegraphed Tombstone: "They got two of our horses, we two of theirs. Think we wounded two, not certain, as they were concealed." There is no evidence that any of the three bandits were wounded. On August 14, Burt Alvord returned to Tombstone; he said none of the posse could even see the outlaws during the fighting. He explained they had buried Robson because the terrain was rough, the posse lost three of their horses, and they didn't have a wagon to transport the body. That same day, John Horton Slaughter, the former Cochise County sheriff; Bert Cogswell, William King, and two Mexican men, joined Leatherwood's posse, somewhere around Mulberry Ranch in western San Simon Valley, where they were resting their horses.

Immediately after the shootout, gang members Bob Christian, Hayes and Young rode to the Gray Ranch, near Victoria, New Mexico, and robbed the place for supplies. On the following night, the three bandits were spotted in the mountains near the Diamond A Ranch by Tom Horn, the chief of the United States Army Apache Scouts. Since he was riding alone, searching for renegade Apache, he took no action other than reporting the sighting when he returned to Fort Grant on August 28. Meanwhile, Black Jack and Musgrave, who had avoided Skeleton Canyon, were hiding somewhere in San Simon Valley. On the night of the shootout, the two raided a horse ranch belonging to the San Simon Cattle Company. Black Jack robbed the ranch hands, forced them to serve dinner, and took two fresh horses to use.

Black Jack and Musgrave showed up at the Mulberry Ranch on August 18, four days after Leatherwood and his posse rested there. They robbed the place and demanded dinner. Some time later, Black Jack and Musgrave came across Robert Hill and Will Pomeroy. Hill was Frank Robson's brother-in-law and was heading to Skeleton Canyon to exhume Robson's body for reburial in Mesa. Saying they were not involved in the skirmish, Black Jack and Musgrave told Hill they liked Robson and expressed sympathy for his widow, offering "financial assistance". After that, the two outlaws headed for the Mexican border town of La Morita. Another posse tracked them there, but the trail eventually turned back into Arizona and was lost.

Although the High Fives had been seen outside the Peloncillo Mountains, Edward L. Hall, the United States Marshal of New Mexico Territory, sent his chief deputy and brother-in-law, Horace W. Loomis, into the area in order to join Leatherwood's posse. On August 24, Loomis telegraphed Hall, saying that the "robbers were encamped behind breast-works of a formidable nature and had stood off the deputies [Leatherwood's posse] so successfully that a considerable force of men would be necessary to dislodge them." In response to Loomis' message, Hall telegraphed the Justice Department and requested help from the 7th Cavalry soldiers at Fort Bayard, New Mexico. Engaged in the Apache Campaign to clear the Peloncillos of renegades, the army was willing to assist the roving posses in their hunt for the five bandits. It took months before they had success.

== See also ==
- List of Old West gunfights
- Yaqui Uprising
