= Jami Macarty =

American poet

Jami Macarty is an American poet who teaches and writes in the United States and in Canada. She teaches creative writing and contemporary poetry at Simon Fraser University in Vancouver, and she is a co-founder of the online poetry journal The Maynard.

Macarty has published four chapbooks: Landscape of the Wait (Finishing Line Press, 2017), Mind of Spring (winner of the Vallum Chapbook Prize, Vallum Chapbook Series, 2017), Instinctive Acts (Nomados Literary Publishers, 2018), and The Whole Catastrophe (Vallum Chapbook Series, 2024). Landscape of the Wait centers on the aftermath of a traumatic car accident, as the speaker's nephew lies in a coma for months and his family tries to make sense of the tragedy. Instinctive Acts follows a poet-speaker as she wanders through the streets of Vancouver, collecting observations and language as she goes.The Whole Catastrophe, a finalist for the 2025 bpNichol Chapbook Award, takes Arizona's Whitewater Draw and New Mexico's Bosque del Apache National Wildlife Refuge as its setting and grief (both personal and ecological) as a theme.

Macarty's first full-length poetry collection, The Minuses, was published by The Center for Literary Publishing in 2020. The Minuses was a winner of the 2020 New Mexico-Arizona Book Awards and was listed in the Community of Literary Magazines and Presses roundup of notable 2020 poetry debuts. The title poem from this collection won the 2016 Real Good Poem Prize (selected by Kiki Petrosino) and was published as a broadside from Rabbit Catastrophe Press. The poem "Thin Attachment" from this collection also appeared in the June 24, 2021 edition of Poetry Daily. The poems in The Minuses combine ecological observation with mathematical terminology. The Minuses has also been described as an ecofeminist text, situating its speaker in the sky and in the landscape (particularly the landscape of the Sonoran Desert). Writing in Interim magazine, reviewer Lucy Aul observes that "the book is in dialogue with a theological concept of detachment, wherein what is sought is a release from desire"; Bill Neumire notes in a review for Vallum that The Minuses "engages with [the] notion of minuses as subtraction, loss, missingness, but also the Buddhist idea of that which you gain by losing desire and distraction." Macarty is a practitioner of yoga and meditation, and these practices inform her creative work.

Macarty's second full-length collection, The Long Now Conditions Permit, won the 2023 Test Site Poetry Prize and is a 2025 University of Nevada Press title.
