= Skeleton Canyon =

Landform on the Arizona and New Mexico state line

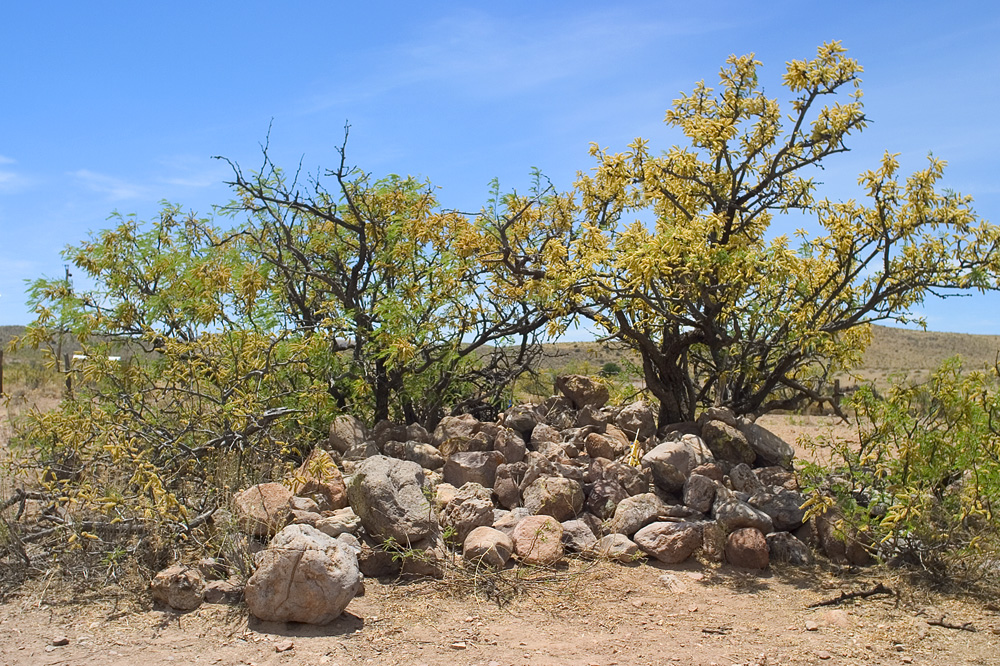
A pile of stones marking the site of Geronimo's surrender.

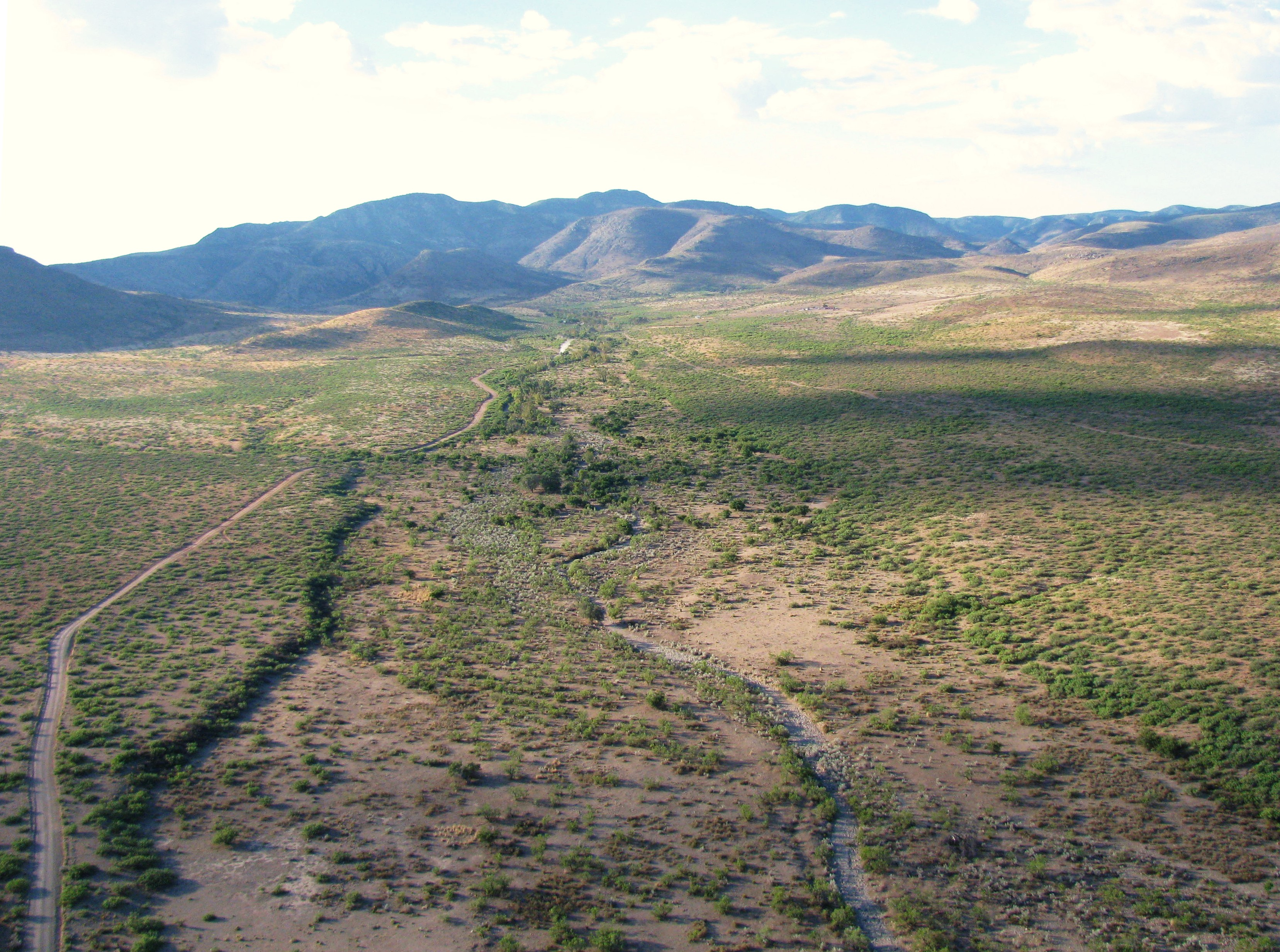
An aerial view of the mouth of Skeleton Canyon

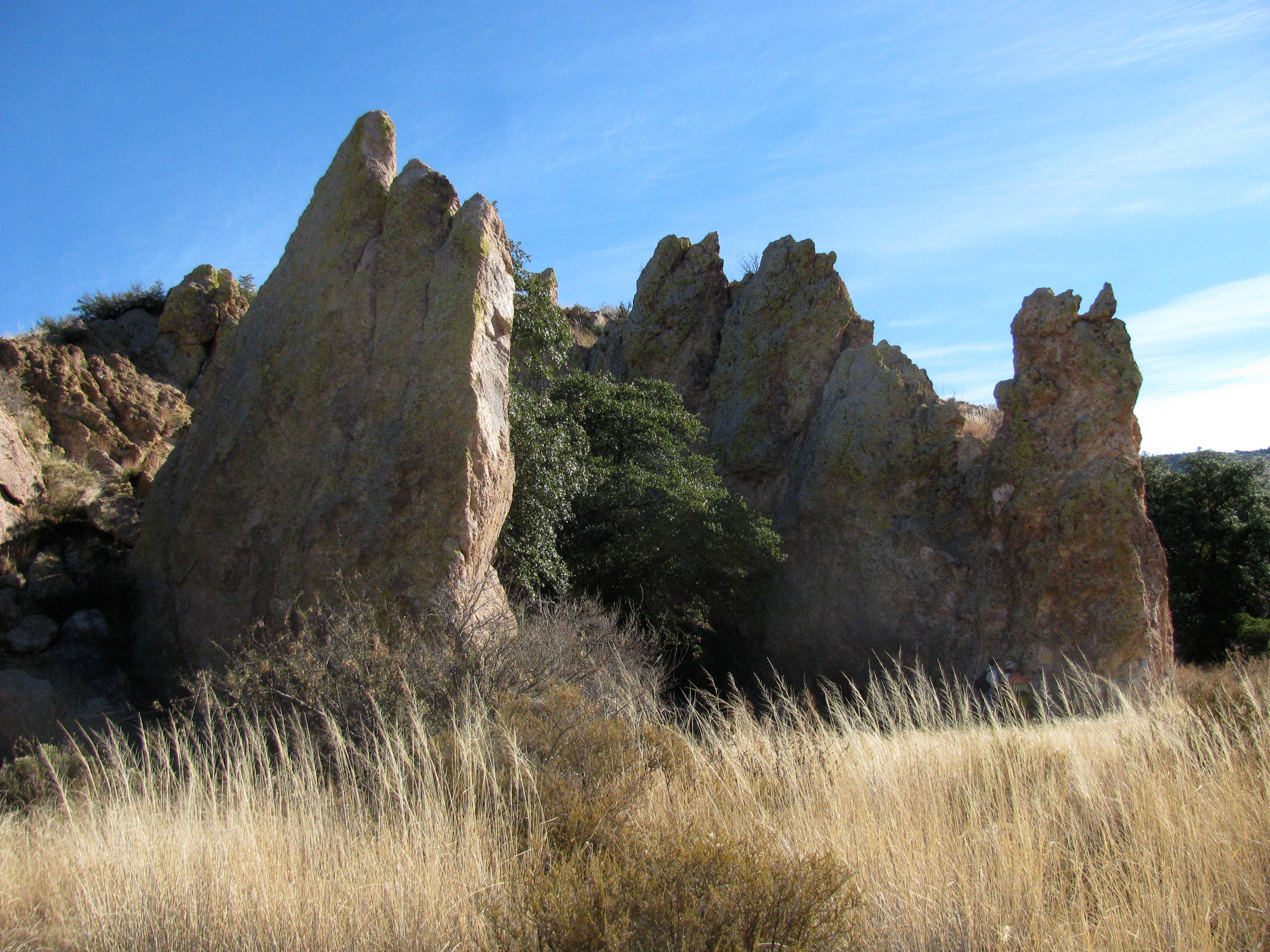
Devils Kitchen at the mouth of Skeleton Canyon, Peloncillo Mountains

Skeleton Canyon, called Cañon Bonita by the Mexicans, is a canyon located 30 miles (50 km) northeast of the town of Douglas, Arizona, in the Peloncillo Mountains, which straddle the modern Arizona and New Mexico state line, in the New Mexico Bootheel region.

This canyon connects the Animas Valley of New Mexico with the San Simon Valley of Arizona, and was once a main route between the United States and Mexico for both legal and illegal traffic. While originally known as Guadalupe Canyon, the area came to be called Skeleton Canyon, owing to the bones of cows and humans left behind by cattle drives from Mexico.

== Battles ==
The canyon was the site of several battles during the American Old West. In 1879, a group of outlaw Cowboys attacked a group of Mexican Rurales and stole their cattle. In July 1881, Curly Bill Brocius attacked and killed about a dozen Mexican smugglers carrying silver and heading to the United States. In retribution, the Mexican government attacked and killed Newman Haynes Clanton and others as they were driving cattle through Guadalupe Canyon. In 1883, Apache Indians from Chihuahua's band surprised eight troopers of Troop D, Fourth Cavalry, killed three men, burned the wagons and supplies, and drove off forty horses and mules.

== Geronimo's surrender ==
Geronimo's final surrender to General Nelson A. Miles on September 4, 1886, occurred at the western edge of the canyon. Because the surrender site is now on private property, a commemorative monument has been erected to the northwest along SR 80, where it intersects with Skeleton Canyon Road in Arizona, at geographic coordinates 31°41′28″N 109°07′56″W. The mouth of the canyon lies about 9.5 mi (15.3 km) to the southeast just west of the Arizona – New Mexico line.

== Murders and shootouts ==
On November 4, 1889, Judson "Comanche" White was found dead in Skeleton Canyon after being killed by person or persons unknown; all his possessions had been stolen as well.

On August 12, 1896, the Skeleton Canyon shootout occurred between members of the High Fives Gang and a posse of lawmen. The gang, led by Black Jack Christian, had recently split up after a failed bank robbery in Nogales, Arizona, and were being pursued by lawmen. During the gunfight at the entrance of Skeleton Canyon, one posse member, Frank Robson, was killed, and several others were wounded, but the outlaws managed to fight off their pursuers and escape into New Mexico Territory. Despite continued pursuit by law enforcement and the U.S. Army in the Peloncillo Mountains, the gang remained at large for months.

== See also ==
- Geronimo's War and the role of two Apache scouts
- Indian Wars West of the Mississippi
- Skeleton Canyon Shootout
- Skeleton Canyon Massacre
- Skeleton Canyon treasure
- Guadalupe Canyon Massacre
