= San Bernardino River =

River in Mexico

Rio San Bernardino
- Location of mouth

Location
- Country: United States, Mexico
- States: Arizona, Sonora

Physical characteristics
- Mouth
  - coordinates: 30°48′N 109°11′W

Basin features
- River system: Bavispe River

The Rio San Bernardino, or San Bernardino River, begins in extreme southeastern Cochise County, Arizona, and is a tributary of the Bavispe River, in Sonora, Mexico.

== Watershed ==
The Rio San Bernardino has two major tributaries, the Rio de Agua Prieta and the Arroyo Cajón Bonito. The river's headwaters are in extreme southeastern Cochise County, Arizona as Black Draw. From here the Rio San Bernardino flows south, crossing into Mexico east of Douglas, Arizona. In northern Sonora, the Cajón Bonito River joins the San Bernardino River in the San Bernardino Valley after draining the Sierra San Luis and northern end of the Sierra Madre Occidental. Next the Rio San Bernardino is joined by the Agua Prieta River which also begins in Cochise County, crossing south as Whitewater Draw into Mexico at Douglas and Agua Prieta. The Agua Prieta River flows south and east to join the Rio San Bernardino, shortly after the Rio Agua Prieta has its confluence with the Rio Fronteras, the latter flowing north from near Nacozari de Garcia, Sonora. The San Bernardino River joins the Bavispe River at Morelos, Sonora at the northern end of the Sierra del Tigre. The Bavispe River flows south by southwest to the Yaqui River and eventually to the Gulf of California at Ciudad Obregon, Sonora.

== Ecology ==
North American beaver (Castor canadensis) were documented by Leopold in 1977 in northern Mexico, and a 2000 survey found five breeding pairs of beavers on the Cajón Bonito River mostly in remote ranches without livestock. The authors of the latter study reported that local ranchers kill beavers because they fear felled trees will block roads. However, beavers are considered keystone species and ecosystem engineers, as their dams raise the water table and turn seasonal stretches of streams into perennial reaches, producing highly beneficial impacts on species abundance and diversity in the riparian zone. Beavers were also documented by Hendrickson et al. in 1978 on the Cajón Bonito.

== See also ==
- List of rivers of Arizona
- List of rivers of Mexico
