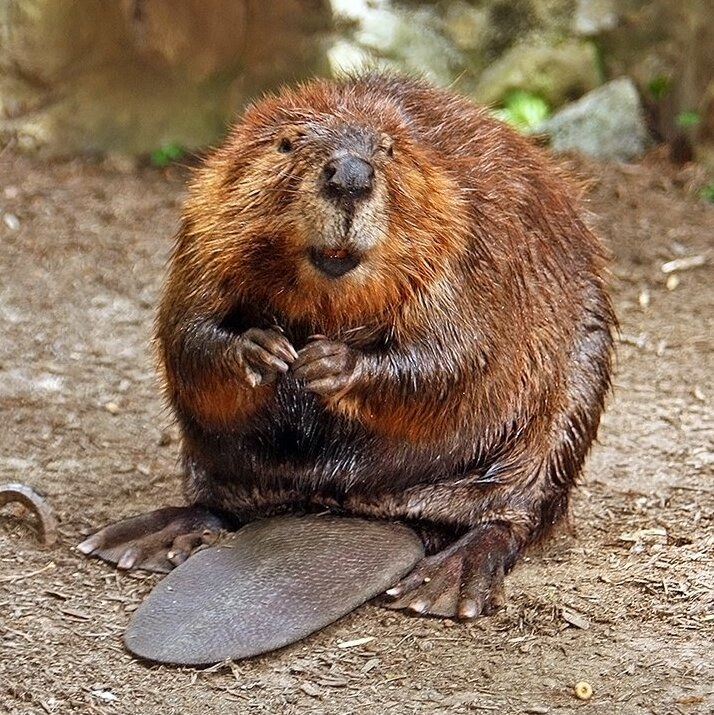
- A male North American beaver

Conservation status
- Least Concern (IUCN 3.1)

- Secure (NatureServe)

Scientific classification
- Kingdom: Animalia
- Phylum: Chordata
- Class: Mammalia
- Order: Rodentia
- Family: Castoridae
- Genus: Castor
- Species: C. canadensis

Binomial name
- Castor canadensis Kuhl, 1820

Subspecies
- List: C. c. acadicus Bailey and Doutt, 1942; C. c. baileyi Nelson, 1927; C. c. belugae Taylor, 1916 Cook Inlet beaver; C. c. caecator Bangs (1913:513) Newfoundland beaver; C. c. canadensis Kuhl 1820 Canadian beaver; C. c. carolinensis Rhoads 1898 Carolina beaver; C. c. concisor Warren and Hall, 1939; C. c. duchesnei Durrant and Crane, 1948; C. c. frondator Mearns, 1897 Sonora beaver; C. c. idoneus Jewett and Hall, 1940; C. c. labradorensis Bailey and Doutt, 1942; C. c. leucodonta Gray, 1869 Pacific beaver; C. c. mexicanus Bailey, 1913 Rio Grande beaver; C. c. michiganensis Bailey 1913 Woods beaver; C. c. missouriensis Bailey 1919 Missouri River beaver; C. c. pacificus Rhoads 1892 Washington beaver; C. c. pallidus Durrant and Crane, 1948; C. c. phaeus Heller, 1909 Admiralty beaver; C. c. repentinus Goldman, 1932; C. c. rostralis Durrant and Crane, 1948; C. c. sagittatus Benson, 1933; C. c. shastensis (Taylor, 1916) Shasta beaver; C. c. subauratus (Taylor, 1912) California golden beaver; C. c. taylori Davis, 1939; C. c. texensis Bailey, 1905 Texas beaver
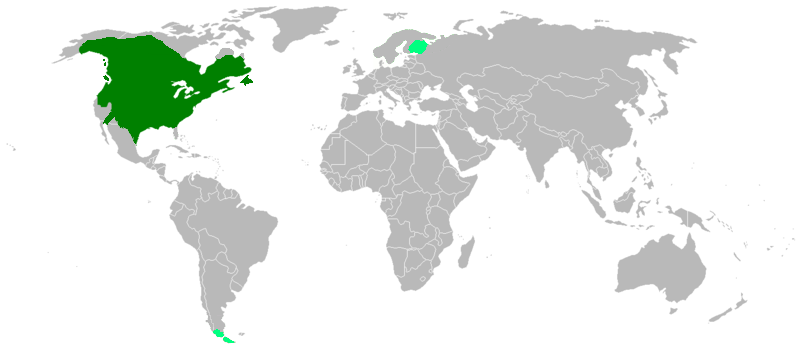
- Distribution of the North American beaver (dark green – native, light green – introduced)

Synonyms
- Castor fiber canadensis

= North American beaver =

Species of dam-building rodent

A beaver swimming, Whistler, British Columbia

The North American beaver (Castor canadensis) is one of two extant beaver species, along with the Eurasian beaver (Castor fiber). It is native to North America and has been introduced in South America (Patagonia) and Europe (primarily Finland and Karelia). The North American beaver is one of the national symbols of Canada and the official state mammal of Oregon and New York. North American beavers are widespread across the continental United States, Canada, southern Alaska, and some parts of northern Mexico.

In Canada and the United States, the North American beaver is often referred to simply as "beaver;" however, this can cause some confusion because another distantly related rodent, Aplodontia rufa, is often called the "mountain beaver". Other vernacular names, including American beaver and Canadian beaver, distinguish this species from the other extant beaver species, Castor fiber, which is native to Eurasia.

== Taxonomy ==
=== Evolution ===
The first fossil records of beavers are 10 to 12 million years old in Germany, and they are thought to have migrated to North America across the Bering land bridge. During the mid to late Pleistocene epoch, giant beavers weighing up to 200 pounds thrived in central North America. These large early beavers were not yet known to fell trees and build dams. The oldest fossil record (Castor californicus) of beavers in North America are of two beaver teeth near Dayville, Oregon, and are 7 million years old. Early beavers had diverse ways of life, taking on terrestrial and semi aquatic forms. Dam building originated over 10 million years ago by a semi-aquatic variation of beavers.

=== Subspecies ===
At one time, 25 subspecies of beavers were identified in North America, with distinctions based primarily on slight morphological differences and geographical isolation at the time of discovery. However, modern techniques generally use genetics rather than morphology to distinguish between subspecies, and currently the Integrated Taxonomic Information System (which provides authoritative taxonomic information on plants, animals, fungi, and microbes of North America and the world) does not recognize any subspecies of C. canadensis, though a definitive genetic analysis has not been performed. Such an analysis would be complicated by the fact that substantial genetic mixing of populations has occurred because of the numerous reintroduction efforts intended to help the species recover following extirpation from many regions.

The most widespread (formerly recognized) subspecies, which perhaps are now best thought of as populations with some distinct physical characteristics, are C. c. acadicus (New England beaver), C. c. canadensis (Canadian beaver), C. c. carolinensis (Carolina beaver), and C. c. missouriensis (Missouri River beaver). The Canadian beaver originally inhabited almost all of the forested area of Canada, and because of its more valued fur, was often selected for reintroductions elsewhere. The Carolina beaver is found in the southeastern United States; the Missouri River beaver, as its name suggests, is found in the Missouri River and its tributaries; and C. c. acadicus is found throughout the New England area in the northeastern United States.

== Description ==
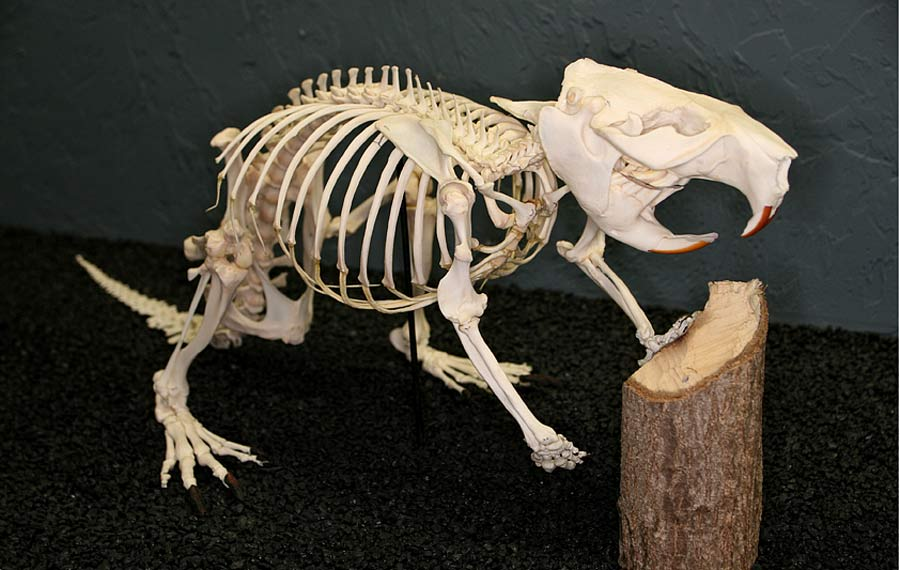
North American beaver skeleton (Museum of Osteology)

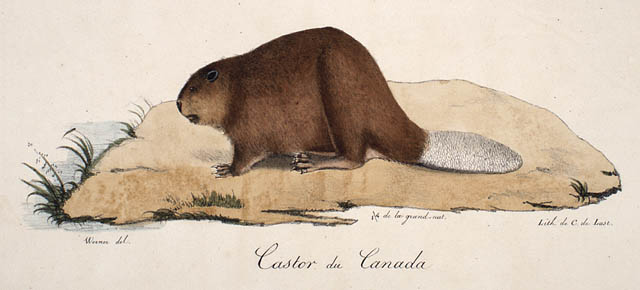
Lithograph of a Canadian beaver, 1819

The beaver is the largest rodent in North America and competes with its Eurasian counterpart, the European beaver, for being the third-largest in the world, both following the South American capybara and lesser capybara. The European species is slightly larger on average but the American has a larger known maximum size. Adults usually weigh from 11 to 32 kg (24 to 71 lb), with 20 kg (44 lb) being typical. In New York, the average weight of adult male beavers was 18.9 kg (42 lb), while non-native females in Finland averaged 18.1 kg (40 lb). However, adults of both sexes averaged 16.8 kg (37 lb) in Ohio. The species seems to conform to Bergmann's rule, as northern animals appear to be larger. In the Northwest Territory, adults weighed a median of 20.5 kg (45 lb). The American beaver is slightly smaller in average body mass than the Eurasian species. The head-and-body length of adult North American beavers is 74–90 cm (29–35 in), with the tail adding a further 20–35 cm (7.9–13.8 in). Very old individuals can exceptionally exceed normal sizes, weighing more than 40 kg (88 lb) or even as much as 50 kg (110 lb).

The beavers are semiaquatic with physical traits suited to this lifestyle. It has a large, scaly, paddle-shaped tail and webbed hind feet. The unwebbed front feet are smaller, have claws, and are highly dexterous. Beavers use their front feet for digging, to feed themselves, and to maneuver small stems as they gnaw bark off trees. The eyes are covered by a nictitating membrane which allows the beaver to see underwater. The nostrils and ears are sealed while submerged. Their lips can be closed behind their front teeth so that they can continue to gnaw underwater. A thick layer of fat under its skin provides insulation.

The beaver's fur consists of long, coarse outer hairs and short, fine inner hairs, and is usually dark brown. Scent glands near the genitals secrete an oily substance known as castoreum, which the beaver uses to waterproof its fur. There is also another set of oil glands producing unique chemical identifiers in the form of waxy esters and fatty acids.

The beaver, like all rodents, possesses continuously growing incisors, and is a hindgut fermenter whose cecum, populated by symbiotic bacteria, helps to digest plant-based material. The beaver is specialized for efficient digestion of its lignocellulose-heavy diet.

== Distribution ==
Beavers were practically ubiquitous and lived from south of the arctic tundra to the deserts of northern Mexico, and from the Atlantic to the Pacific Oceans, but were trapped across the continent for economic gain and political competition, leading to regional extirpation in many regions like the Great Plains. Certain areas saw near-extirpations and declining numbers, but not extirpation, partially due to various conservation measures taken, with mixed results, by the Hudson's Bay Company. By the 1900s and 1910s, beavers existed largely in isolated pockets, but where those pockets existed is not well documented. However, despite these difficulties, reintroduction and natural spread has restored the species back into most of its natural range. They are widely distributed in boreal and temperate ecoregions, where populations are rebounding from historic over-exploitation. Recently, beavers have been observed colonizing arctic tundra, likely as a result of climate-induced increases in riparian shrubs.

Records of beavers at the southern extent of their range have historically been somewhat sparse. Nevertheless, they have been reported in the North American southwest as early as the mid-19th century. Historical and contemporary reports of their presence have been made in the Sonora River, the Colorado River, Bavispe River, and the San Bernardino River in the northern Mexican states of Sonora and Chihuahua (state).

Some scientists believe the species may have been present in Eastern Eurasia historically in regions such as the Anadyr, Amur, and Lena River Basins as opposed to C. fiber as species like wolves and moose in these regions are genetically closer to North American populations than Eurasian populations, although this is unconfirmed.

== Behavior ==
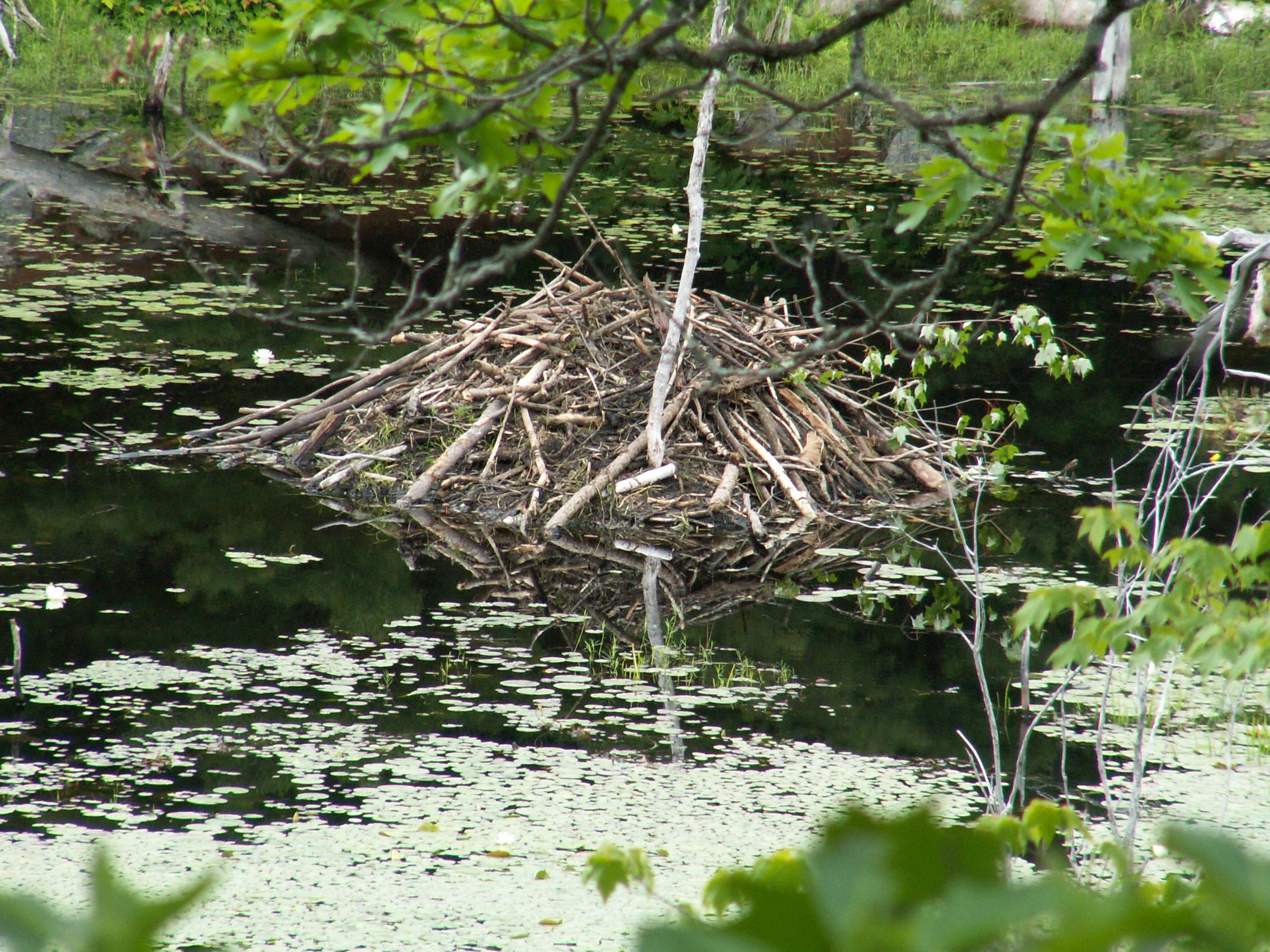
Beaver lodge, Ontario, Canada

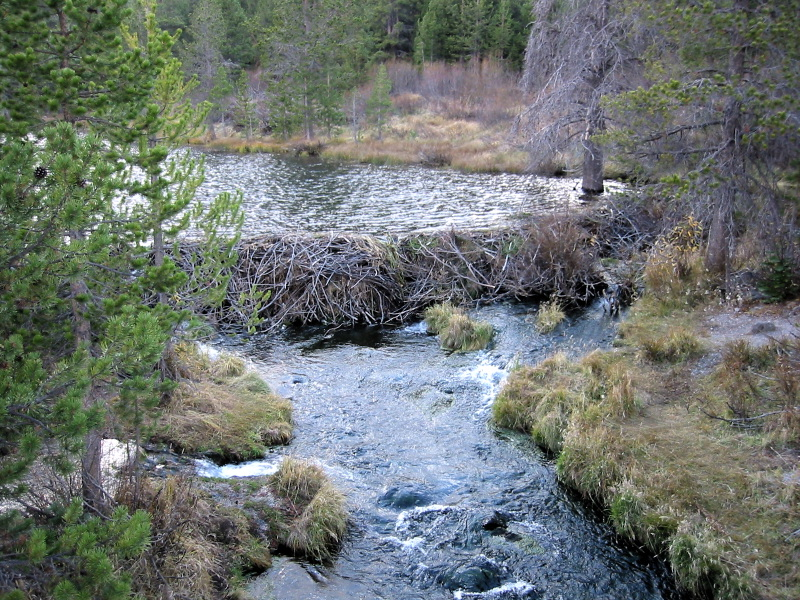
Beaver dam, northern California, USA

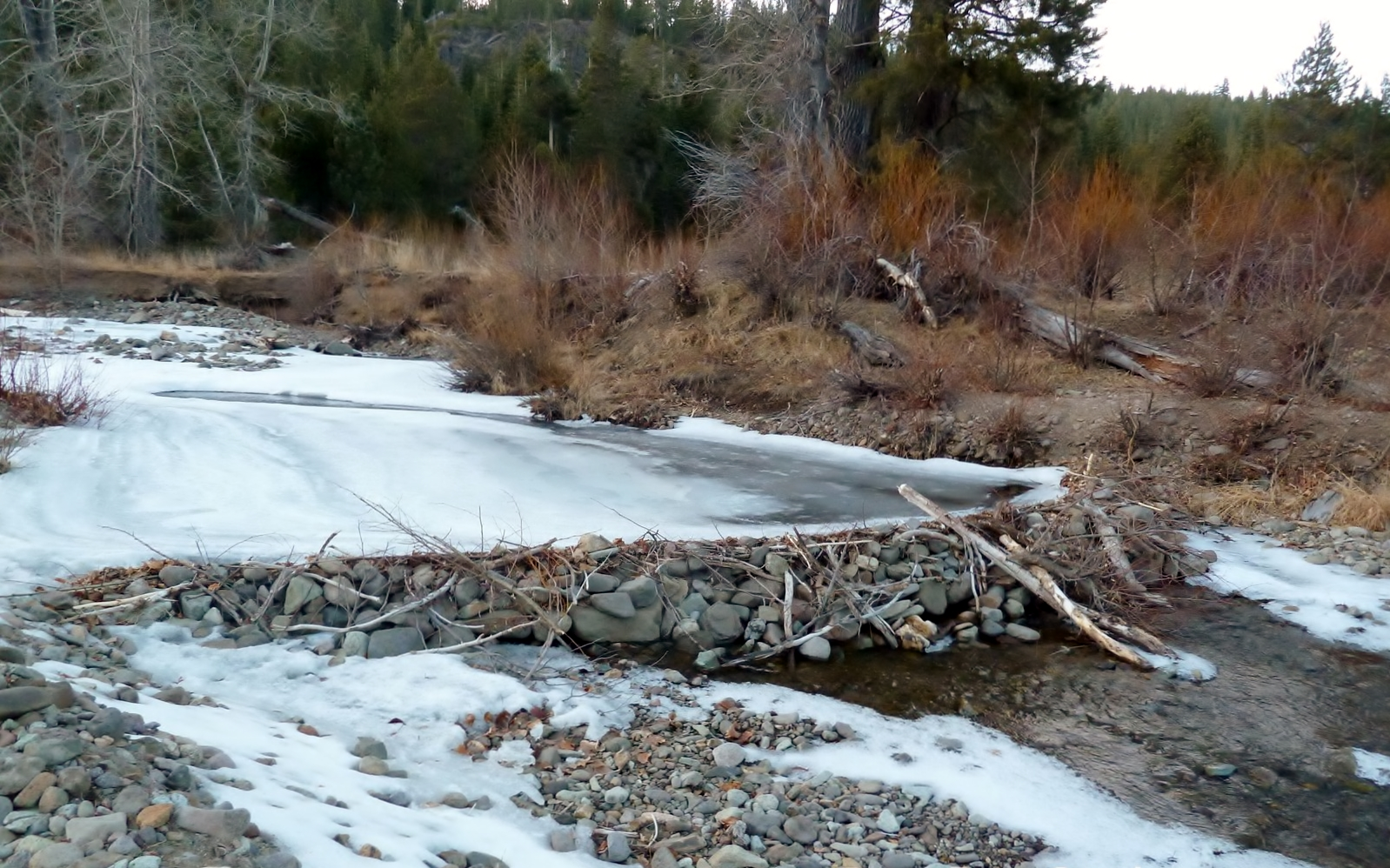
Beavers use rocks for their dams when mud and branches are less available, as seen on Bear Creek, a tributary to the Truckee River, in Alpine Meadows, California.

Beavers are active mainly at night. They are excellent swimmers and may remain submerged up to 15 minutes. More vulnerable on land, they tend to remain in the water as much as possible. They use their flat, scaly tail both to signal danger by slapping the surface of the water and as a location for fat storage.

They construct their homes, or "lodges", out of sticks, twigs, rocks, and mud in lakes, streams, and tidal river deltas. These lodges may be surrounded by water, or touching land, including burrows dug into river banks. Beavers are well known for building dams across streams and constructing their lodges in the ponds which form. When building in a pond, the beavers first make a pile of sticks and then eat out one or more underwater entrances and two platforms above the water surface inside the pile. The first is used for drying off. Towards winter, the lodge is often plastered with mud which, when it freezes, has the consistency of concrete. A small air hole is left in the top of the lodge.

=== Dam-building ===
The purpose of the dam is to create a deepwater refuge enabling the beaver to escape from predators. When deep water is already present in lakes, rivers, or larger streams, the beaver may dwell in a bank burrow and bank lodge with an underwater entrance. The beaver dam is constructed using branches from trees the beavers cut down, as well as rocks, grass, and mud. Where naturally occurring woody material is limited, beavers may build their dams largely of rocks. Beavers cut down trees using their strong incisor teeth, and use their front feet for digging, carrying, and placing materials. The sound of running water dictates when and where a beaver builds its dam. Besides providing a safe home for the beaver, beaver ponds also provide habitat for waterfowl, fish, and other aquatic animals. Their dams help reduce soil erosion and can help reduce flooding. However, beaver dams are not permanent and depend on the beavers' continued presence for their maintenance. Beavers generally concentrate on building and repairing dams in the fall in preparation for the coming winter. In northern areas, they often do not repair breaches in the dam made by otters, and sometimes breach the dam themselves and lower the water level in the pond to create more breathing space under the ice or get easier access to trees below the dam. In a 1988 study in Alberta, Canada, no beavers repaired "sites of water loss" during the winter. Of 178 sites of water loss, beavers repaired 78 when water was opened, and did not repair 68. The rest were partially repaired.

Beavers are best known for their dam-building. They maintain their pond-habitat by reacting quickly to the sound of running water, and damming it up with tree branches and mud. Early ecologists believed that this dam-building was an amazing feat of architectural planning, indicative of the beaver's high intellect. This theory was tested when a recording of running water was played in a field near a beaver pond. Although it was on dry land, the beaver covered the tape player with branches and mud. The largest beaver dam is 2,790 ft (850 m) in length—more than half a mile long—and was discovered via satellite imagery in 2007. It is located on the southern edge of Wood Buffalo National Park in northern Alberta and is more than twice the width of the Hoover Dam which spans 1,244 ft (379 m).

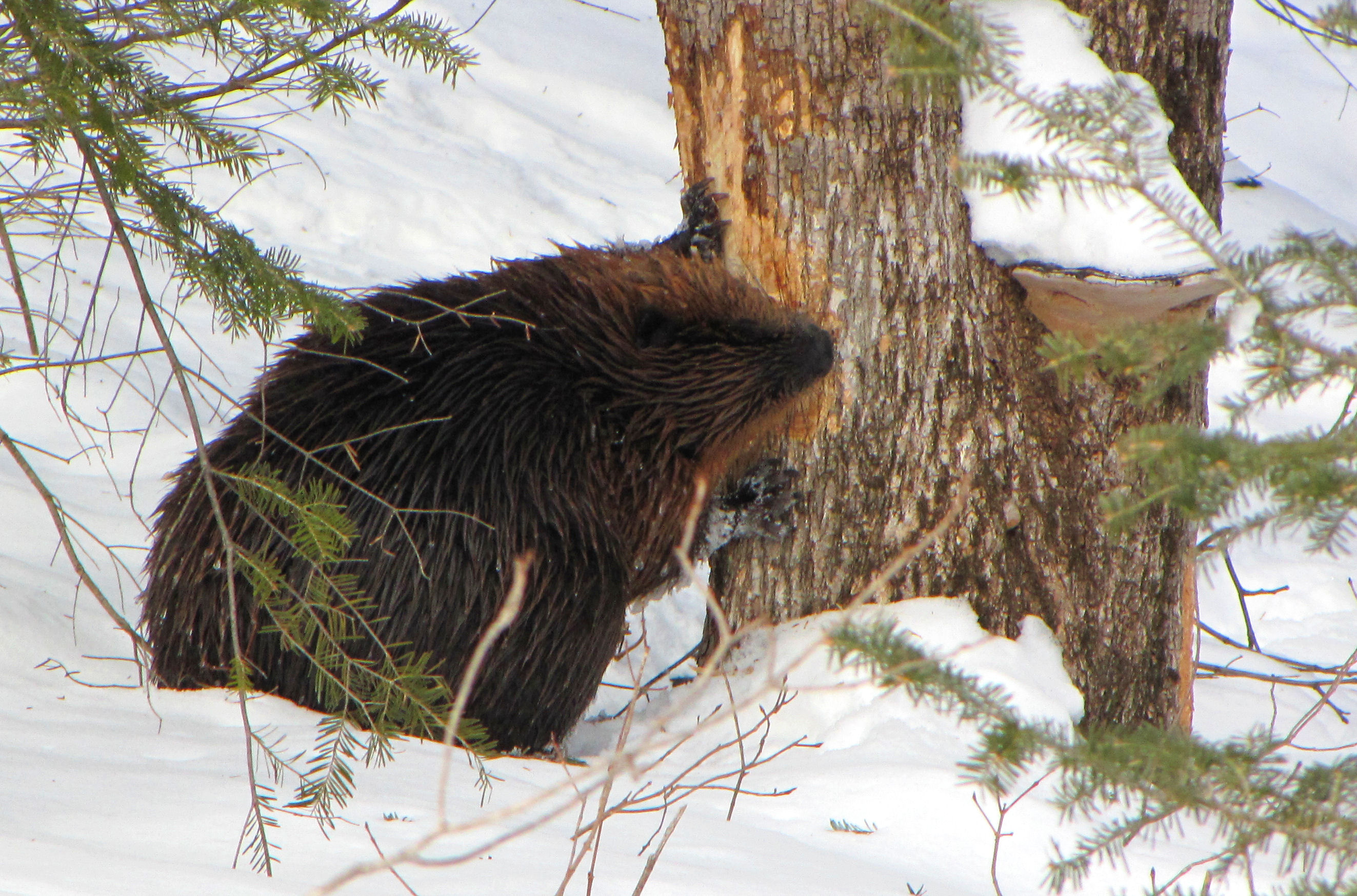
C. c. canadensis, feeding in winter

Normally, the purpose of the dam is to provide water around their lodges that is deep enough that it does not freeze solid in winter. The dams also flood areas of surrounding forest, giving the beaver safe access to an important food supply, which is the leaves, buds, and inner bark of growing trees. In colder climates where their pond freezes over, beavers also build a food cache from this food resource. To form the cache, beavers collect food in late fall in the form of tree branches, storing them under water (usually by sticking the sharp chewed base of the branches into the mud on the pond bottom), where they can be accessed through the winter. Often, the pile of food branches projects above the pond and collects snow. This insulates the water below it and keeps the pond open at that location. The frozen combination of branches and ice is known as a cap, sealing the food cache. Beavers often maintain an underwater entrance to their dam, and they can access their food cache from their lodge by swimming under the ice. In warmer climes, a winter food store is less common.

Muskrats have been thought to steal food from beaver lodges, but seemingly cooperative relationships exist, with beavers allowing muskrats to reside in their lodge if they gather fresh reeds.

=== Canals ===
Another component to the beaver's habitat is the canal. Canals are used to float logs to a pond, and dams may also be used to maintain the water levels in these canals. Several land trails can extend from the canals. Despite being widespread in some beaver-inhabited areas, beaver canals and their environmental effects are much less studied than beaver dams. Beaver primarily develop canals to increase accessibility of river resources, facilitate transport of acquired resources, and to decrease the risk of predation. Beaver canals can be over 0.5 km in length. Beavers build canals by pushing through soil and vegetation using their forelimbs.

It has been hypothesized that beavers' canals are not only transportation routes to extend foraging, but also an extension of their "central place" around the lodge and/or food cache. A 2012 study of beavers' mark on the landscape found that cut stumps were negatively related to distance from beaver canals, but not to the central body of water. This finding suggested that beavers may consider the canals to be part of their "central place" as far as foraging activity is concerned.

=== Social behavior ===
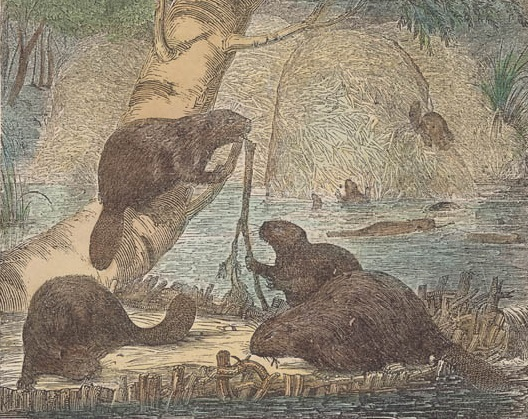
A group of Canadian beavers and their dam on a river.

Communication is highly developed in beavers, including scent marking, vocalization, and tail slapping. Beavers deposit castoreum on piles of debris and mud called scent mounds, which are usually placed on or near lodges, dams, and trails less than a meter from water. Over 100 of such mounds can be constructed within one territory. Beaver colonies with close neighbors construct more "scent mounds" than isolated colonies, and the number of scent mounds at each active lodge is correlated with the distance to the nearest occupied lodge.

Although seven vocal sounds have been described for beavers, most zoologists recognize only three: a whine, hiss, and growl. Vocalizations and tail slapping may be used to beg for food, signal to family members to warn of predators, or to drive away or elicit a response from predators.

Beavers usually mate for life, forming familial colonies. Beaver "kits" are born precocious and with a developed coat. The young beaver "kits" typically remain with their parents up to two years. Kits express some adult behaviors, but require a long period in the family to develop their dam construction skills, and other abilities required for independent life.

=== Diet ===
Beavers are herbivorous generalists with sophisticated foraging preferences based on taste, coarse physical shape, and odor. Beavers consume a mix of herbaceous and woody plants, which varies considerably in both composition and species diversity by region and season. Beavers feed on bark, cambium, branches, twigs, roots, buds, leaves, stems, sprouts, and in some cases, sap and storax. They prefer aspen and other poplars, but do also eat birch, maple, willow, alder, black cherry, red oak, beech, ash, hornbeam, and occasionally pine, sweetgum, and spruce. Beavers do not prefer red maple, which can be the only tree left standing at the edges of some beaver ponds. They also eat cattails, water lilies, and other aquatic vegetation, especially in the early spring. Contrary to widespread belief, they do not eat fish.

When herbaceous plants are actively growing, they make up much of the beaver's diet. In the winter, beavers switch to woody plants and the food they have stored over the winter. The protein to calorie ratio of a beaver's diet is 40 mg/calorie in summer and 8 mg/calorie for the rest of the year. In northern latitudes, the water lilies Nymphaea and Nuphar are the most important herbaceous component. The rhizomes are stored in the food cache and remain actively growing.

The beaver's gut microbiome is complex and specialized for a wood-heavy diet, and shows similarity to that of other mammalian herbivores. Beavers' gut microbiome allows them to digest up to thirty percent of the cellulose they eat.

=== Predators ===
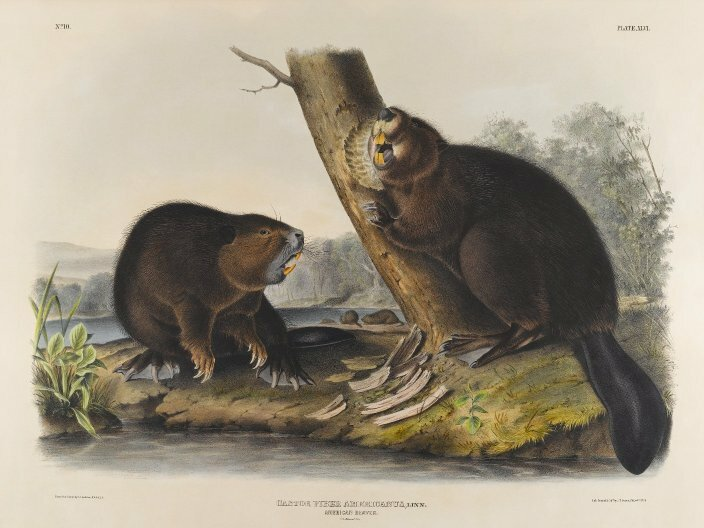
Brooklyn Museum – American Beaver – John J. Audubon

Common natural predators include coyotes, wolves, and mountain lions. American black bears may also prey on beavers if the opportunity arises. Less significant predators include wolverines, which may attack a rare beaver of up to adult size, and Canada lynx, bobcats, and foxes (due to their smaller size, these are typically predators only of kits or very sick or injured animals, rather than full-grown beavers). American alligators, which do not frequently coexist in the wild with beavers, also seldom threaten them. Both golden eagles (Aquila chrysaetos) and bald eagles (Haliaeetus leucocephalus) may on occasion prey on a beaver, likely only small kits. Despite repeated claims, no evidence shows that North American river otters are typically predators of beavers but anecdotally may take a rare beaver kit.

== Reproduction ==
North American beavers have one litter per year, coming into estrus for only 12 to 24 hours, between late December and May but peaking in January. Beaver reproduction occurs earlier in warmer southern climates, however in their northern range beavers may wait until late spring to reproduce. Depending on when beavers reproduce, their litters are typically born between April and June each year. Unlike most other rodents, beaver pairs are monogamous, staying together for multiple breeding seasons. Gestation averages 128 days and they have a range of three to six kits per litter (usually 4–5). Most beavers do not reproduce until they are three years of age, but about 20% of two-year-old females reproduce. Female beavers will prepare for birth by making a soft bed inside the lodge. After birth, young beavers stay sheltered in their lodges for up to a month before they begin to swim and eat solid foods. Juvenile beavers stay with their parents for up to 2 years before leaving to create their own homes.

== Differences from European beaver ==
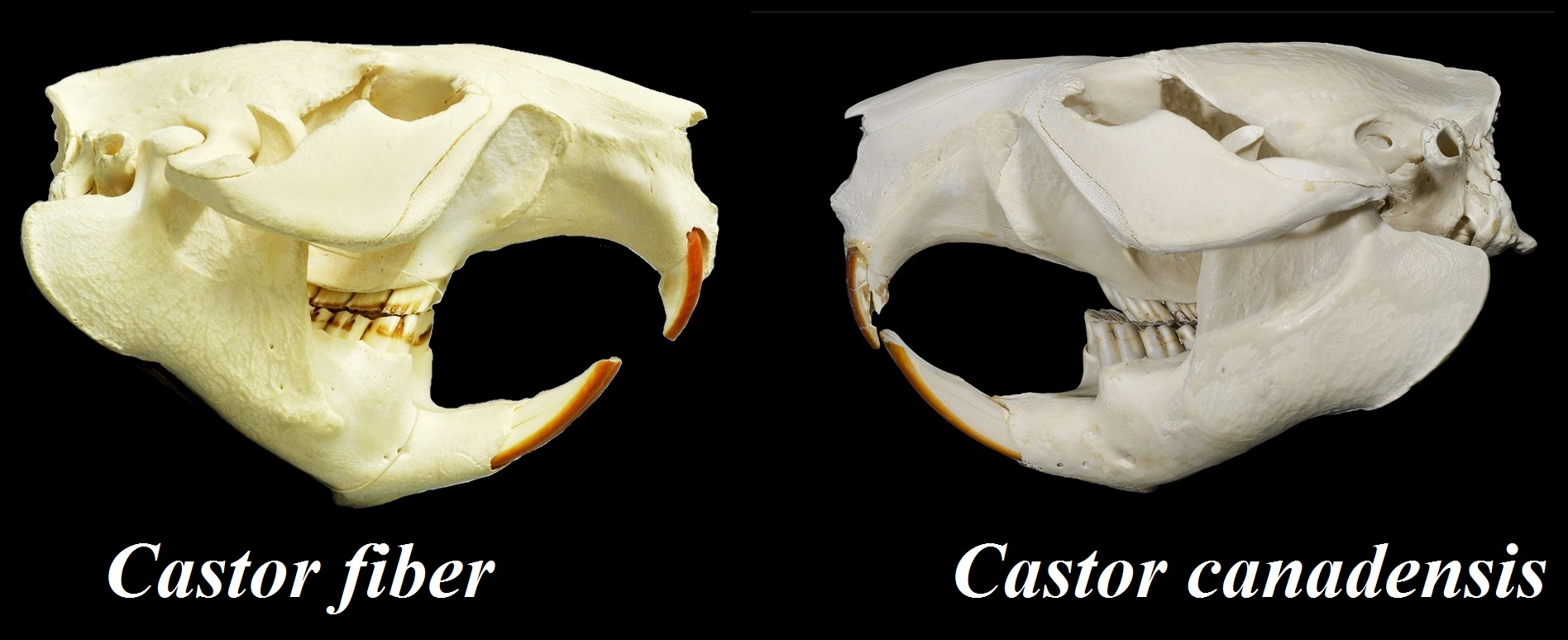
Skulls of a European (left) and North American (right) beaver.

Although North American beavers are superficially similar to the European beaver (Castor fiber), several important differences exist between the two species. North American beavers tend to be slightly smaller, with smaller, more rounded heads; shorter, wider muzzles; thicker, longer, and darker underfur; wider, more oval-shaped tails; and longer shin bones, allowing them a greater range of bipedal locomotion than the European species. North American beavers have shorter nasal bones than their European relatives, with the widest point being at the middle of the snout for the former, and in the tip for the latter. The nasal opening for the North American species is square, unlike that of the European species, which is triangular. The foramen magnum is triangular in the North American beaver, and rounded in the European. The anal glands of the North American beaver are smaller and thick-walled with a small internal volume compared to that of the European species. Finally, the guard hairs of the North American beaver have a shorter hollow medulla at their tips. Fur color is also different. Overall, 50% of North American beavers have pale brown fur, 25% are reddish brown, 20% are brown, and 6% are blackish, while in European beavers, 66% have pale brown or beige fur, 20% are reddish brown, nearly 8% are brown, and only 4% have blackish coats.

The two species are not genetically compatible. North American beavers have 40 chromosomes, while European beavers have 48. Also, more than 27 attempts were made in Russia to hybridize the two species, with one breeding between a male North American beaver and a female European resulting in one stillborn kit. These factors make interspecific breeding unlikely in areas where the two species' ranges overlap.

== Ecology ==
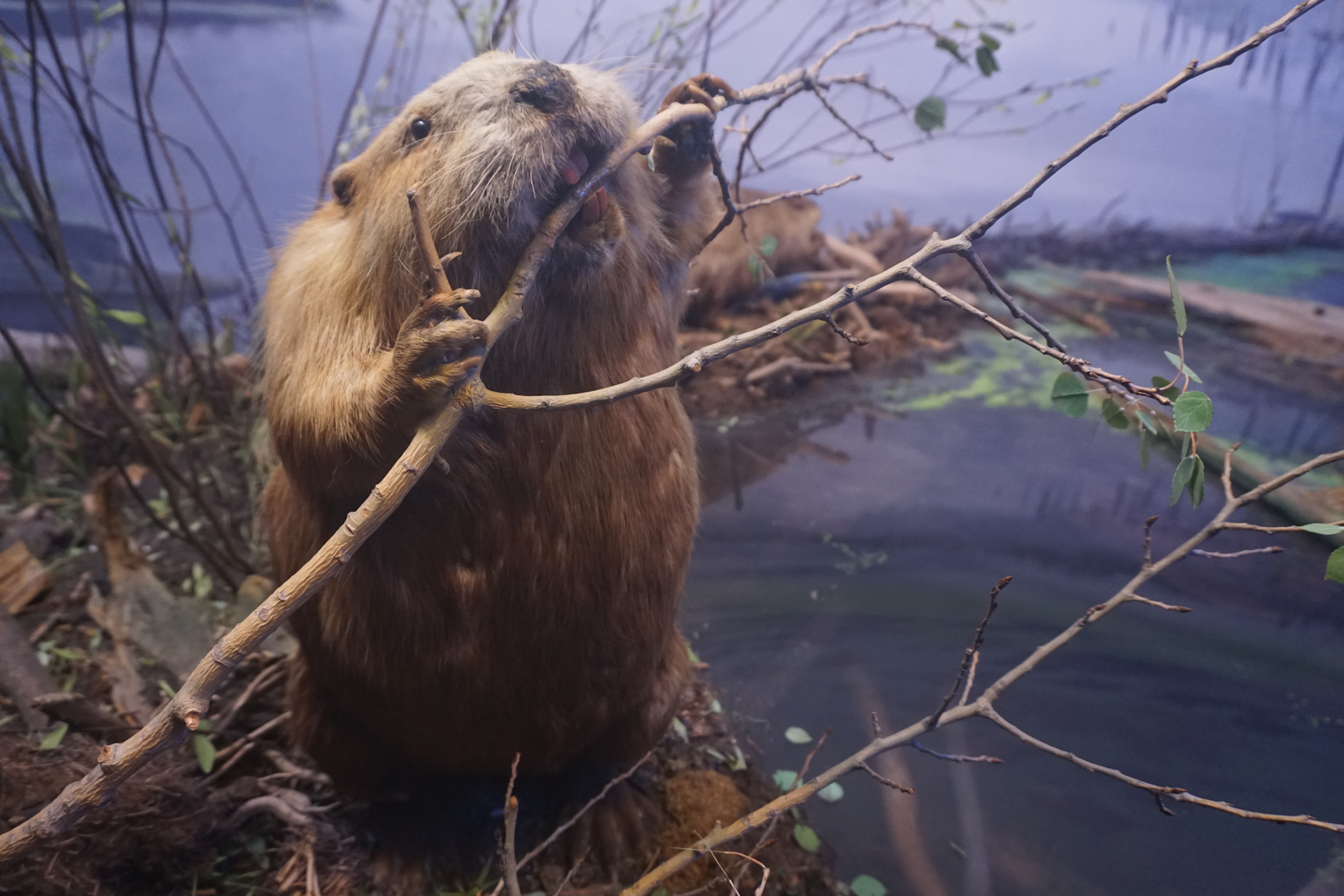
Taxidermied North American beaver at the Milwaukee Public Museum

The beaver was trapped out and almost extirpated in North America because its fur and castoreum were highly sought after. The beaver furs were used to make clothing and beaver hats. In the United States, extensive trapping began in the early 17th century, with more than 10,000 beaver per year taken for the fur trade in Connecticut and Massachusetts between 1620 and 1630. From 1630 to 1640, around 80,000 beavers were taken annually from the Hudson River and western New York. From 1670 onwards, the Hudson's Bay Company sent two or three trading ships into the bay every year to take furs to England from Canada. Archaeological and historical evidence suggests that beaver ponds created "moth-hole like" habitats in the deciduous forest that dominated eastern North America. This nonforest habitat attracted both Native American and early colonial hunters to the abundant fish, waterfowl, and large game attracted to the riparian clearings created by these aquatic mammals. The first colonial farmers were also attracted to the fertile, flat bottomlands created by the accumulated silt and organic matter in beaver ponds.

As eastern beaver populations were depleted, English, French, and American trappers pushed west. Much of the westward expansion and exploration of North America was driven by the quest for this animal's fur. Before the 1849 California Gold Rush, an earlier, 19th-century California Fur Rush drove the earliest American settlement in that state. During the roughly 30 years (1806–1838) of the era of the mountain man, the West from Missouri to California and from Canada to Mexico was thoroughly explored and the beaver was brought to the brink of extinction.

With protection in the late 19th and early 20th centuries, the current beaver population has rebounded to an estimated 10 to 15 million; this is a fraction of the originally estimated 100 to 200 million North American beavers before the days of the fur trade.

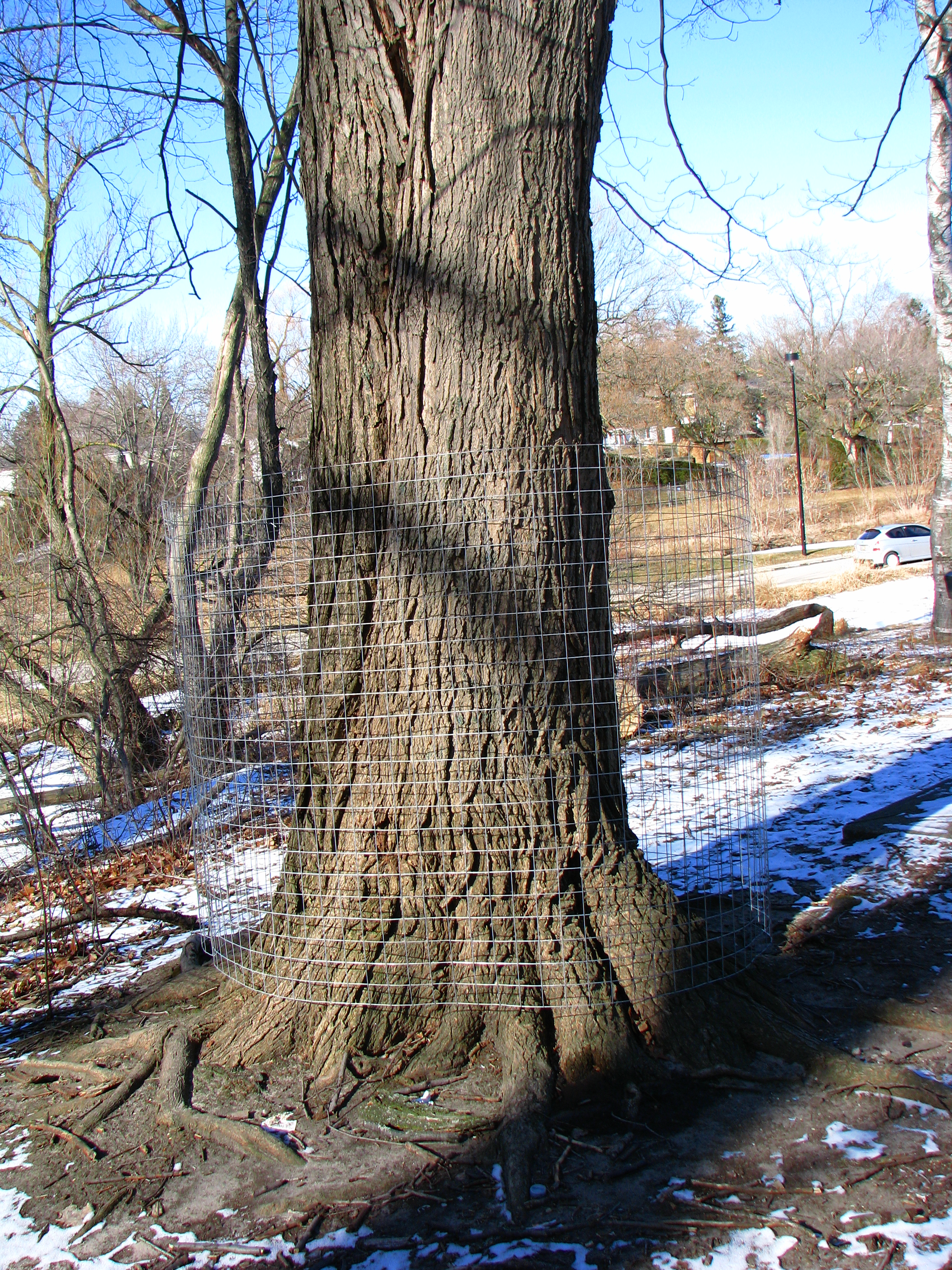
A wire mesh fence installed around a tree trunk in Toronto. Wire mesh fences are used in an attempt to prevent beavers' damage.

The beaver is a keystone species, increasing biodiversity in its territory through creation of ponds and wetlands. As wetlands are formed and riparian habitats enlarged, aquatic plants colonize newly available watery habitat. Insect, invertebrate, fish, mammal, and bird diversities are also expanded. Effects of beaver recolonization on native and non-native species in streams where they have been historically absent, particularly dryland streams, is not well-researched.

== Relationship with humans ==
=== As a pest in native range ===
These animals are considered pests because flooding resulting from beaver dams and falling trees both pose risks to human structures and cropland. Nonlethal methods of containing beaver-related flooding have been developed. One such flow device has been used by both the Canadian and U.S. governments, called "beaver deceivers" or levelers, invented and pioneered by wildlife biologist Skip Lisle.

=== As introduced non-native species ===
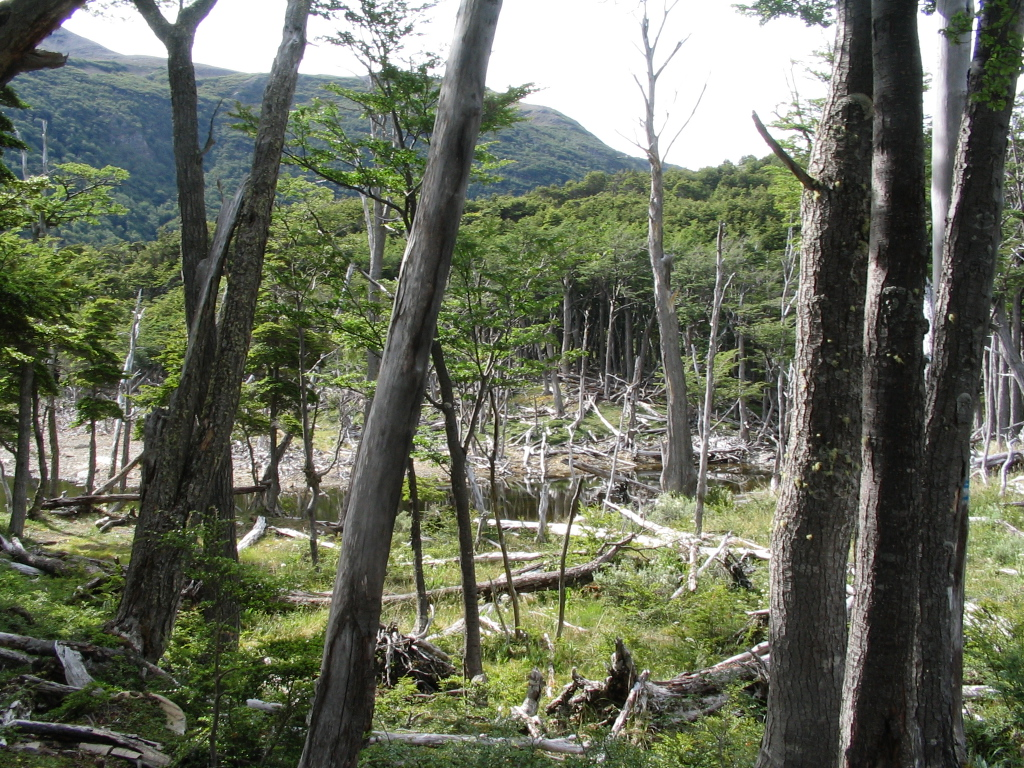
Beaver damage on the north shore of Robalo Lake, Navarino Island, Chile

In the 1940s, beavers were brought to Tierra del Fuego in southern Chile and Argentina for commercial fur production and introduced near Fagnano Lake. Although the fur enterprise failed, 25 mating pairs of beavers were released into the wild. Having no natural predators in their new environment, they quickly spread throughout the main island, and to other islands in the archipelago, reaching a number of 100,000 individuals within just 50 years. Although they have been considered an invasive species, it has been more recently shown that the beaver have some beneficial ecological effects on native fish and should not be considered wholly detrimental. Although the dominant Lenga beech (Nothofagus pumilio) forest can regenerate from stumps, most of the newly created beaver wetlands are being colonized by the rarer native Antarctic beech (Nothofagus antarctica). It is not known whether the shrubbier Antarctic beech will be succeeded by the originally dominant and larger Lengo beech, however, and the beaver wetlands are readily colonized by non-native plant species. In contrast, areas with introduced beaver were associated with increased populations of the native catadromous puye fish (Galaxias maculatus). Furthermore, the beavers did not seem to have a highly beneficial impact on the exotic brook trout (Salvelinus fontinalis) and rainbow trout (Oncorhynchus mykiss) which have negative impacts on native stream fishes in the Cape Horn Biosphere Reserve, Chile. They have also been found to cross saltwater to islands northward; and reached the Chilean mainland in the 1990s. On balance, because of their landscape-wide modifications to the Fuegian environment and because biologists want to preserve the unique biota of the region, most favor their removal.

North American beavers were released in Finland in 1937; following this, 7 beavers expanded to a population of 12,000 within 64 years. Eurasian beavers had earlier been extirpated from the region, so the release was intended as a reintroduction project. By 1999, it was estimated that 90% of beavers in Finland were the American species. However, the species is not always considered invasive, as in Europe it has a similar keystone effect to European beavers, which have not recolonized the area. The beaver population has been controlled by issuing hunting licenses. A report in 2010 concluded that while the current population of American beavers was not problematic, as the species has larger litters than European beavers and builds somewhat larger dams, it could become a problem if its range continues expanding into Russia, but this does not seem to be taking place.

In Europe, significant invasive populations of North American beaver are only present in Finland and Karelia, as the boundary between species has somewhat stabilized, but smaller occurrences have been detected elsewhere. Ephemeral populations of C. canadensis in Germany and Poland were found from the 1950s to 1970s. Zoo escapes in 2006 created a small population of invasive C. canadensis in Luxembourg, Rhineland-Palatinate, and Belgium. American beavers have not been detected in Sweden, Norway, or Denmark.

The European Union, due to the significant negative impacts of its introduction to the ecosystem, has included the North American species of beaver in the list of invasive alien species of Union concern. It therefore cannot be imported, bred, transported, commercialized, or intentionally released into the environment in any of its member states.

=== As food ===
Beaver meat is similar tasting to lean beef or venison, but special care must be taken to prevent contamination from the animal's strong castor gland. Beavers, like other wild game, may also carry diseases such as Giardiasis, Tularemia, and Rabies, so precaution is necessary. Beaver is a valuable food source to Native Americans, who boil, roast, or cook the meat over a fire. The rich, fatty tail roasted on a stick is considered a delicacy. Early French Canadian Catholics called beaver a "four-legged fish" that could be eaten at Lent. "Beaver stew" became a common meal among settlers in North America.

=== Symbolism ===
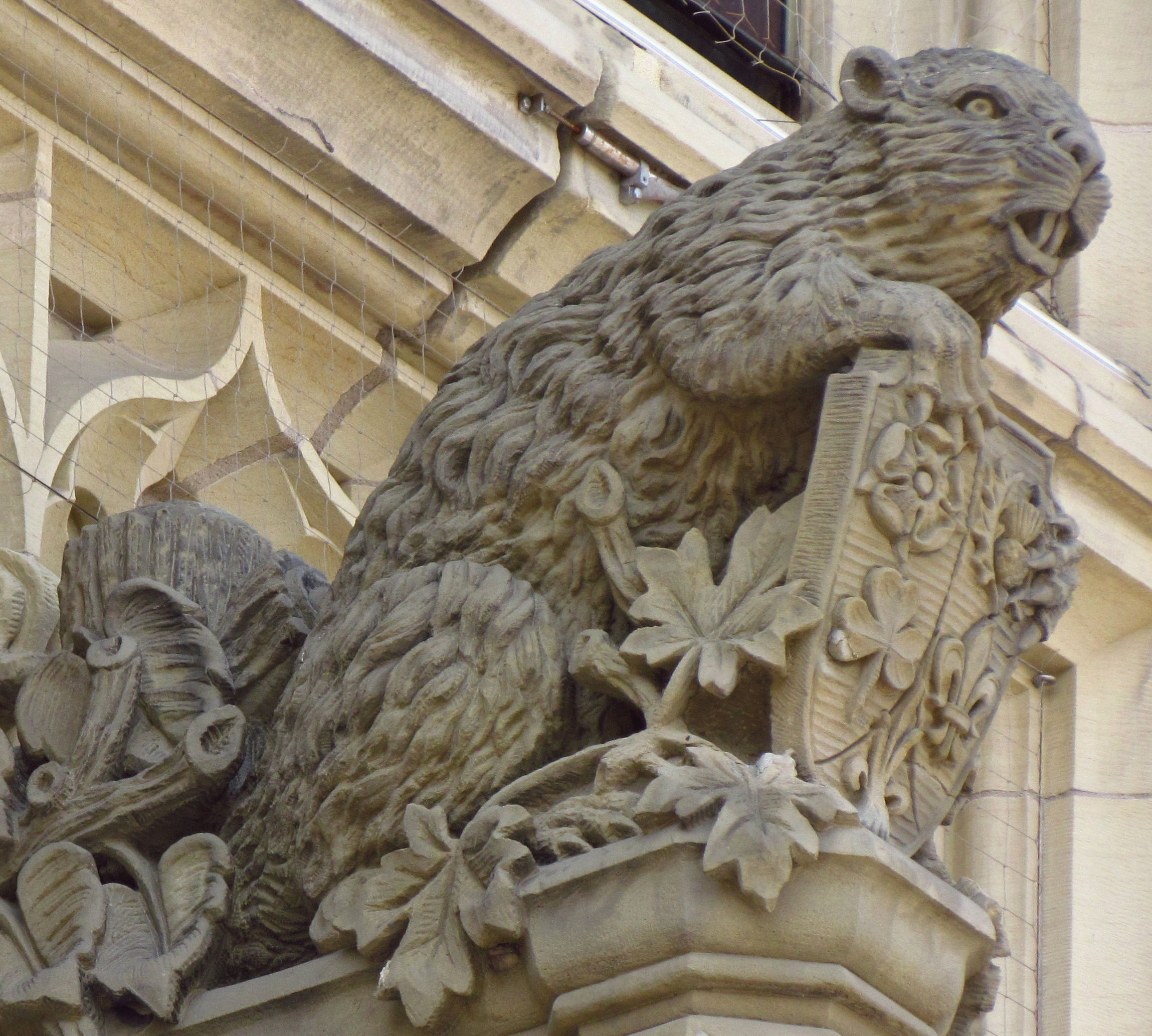
Beaver sculpture over the entrance to the Canadian Parliament Building

Flag of Oregon (reverse)

As one of the national symbols of Canada, the North American beaver is depicted on the Canadian nickel. This beaver was also featured on the first Canadian postage stamp, the Three Penny Beaver, which is considered the first postage stamp to show an animal instead of a head of state. It is also the state animal of Oregon and New York of the United States, and a common school emblem for engineering schools, including the California Institute of Technology, the Massachusetts Institute of Technology, and the University of Alberta as well as the mascot for Oregon State University, Babson College, and the City College of New York. A beaver is featured prominently on the stamp and seal issued to Professional Engineers and Geoscientists by APEGA. It also appears on the back on the state flag of Oregon, and it gives Oregon the nickname “The Beaver State.” The beaver also appears in the coats of arms of the Hudson's Bay Company, University of Toronto, Wilfrid Laurier University, and the London School of Economics.

The beaver is also the symbol of the Royal Canadian Engineers both combat and civil, and is featured on the emblem of the Canadian Pacific Railway.

Busy beaver is a term in theoretical computer science which refers to a terminating program of a given size that produces the most output possible.

Much of the early economy of New Netherland was based on the beaver fur trade. As such, the seal of New Netherland featured the beaver; likewise, the coats of arms of Albany, New York and New York City included the beaver.

== See also ==
- Beaver in the Sierra Nevada
