= Whitewater Draw =

Stream in Cochise County, Arizona

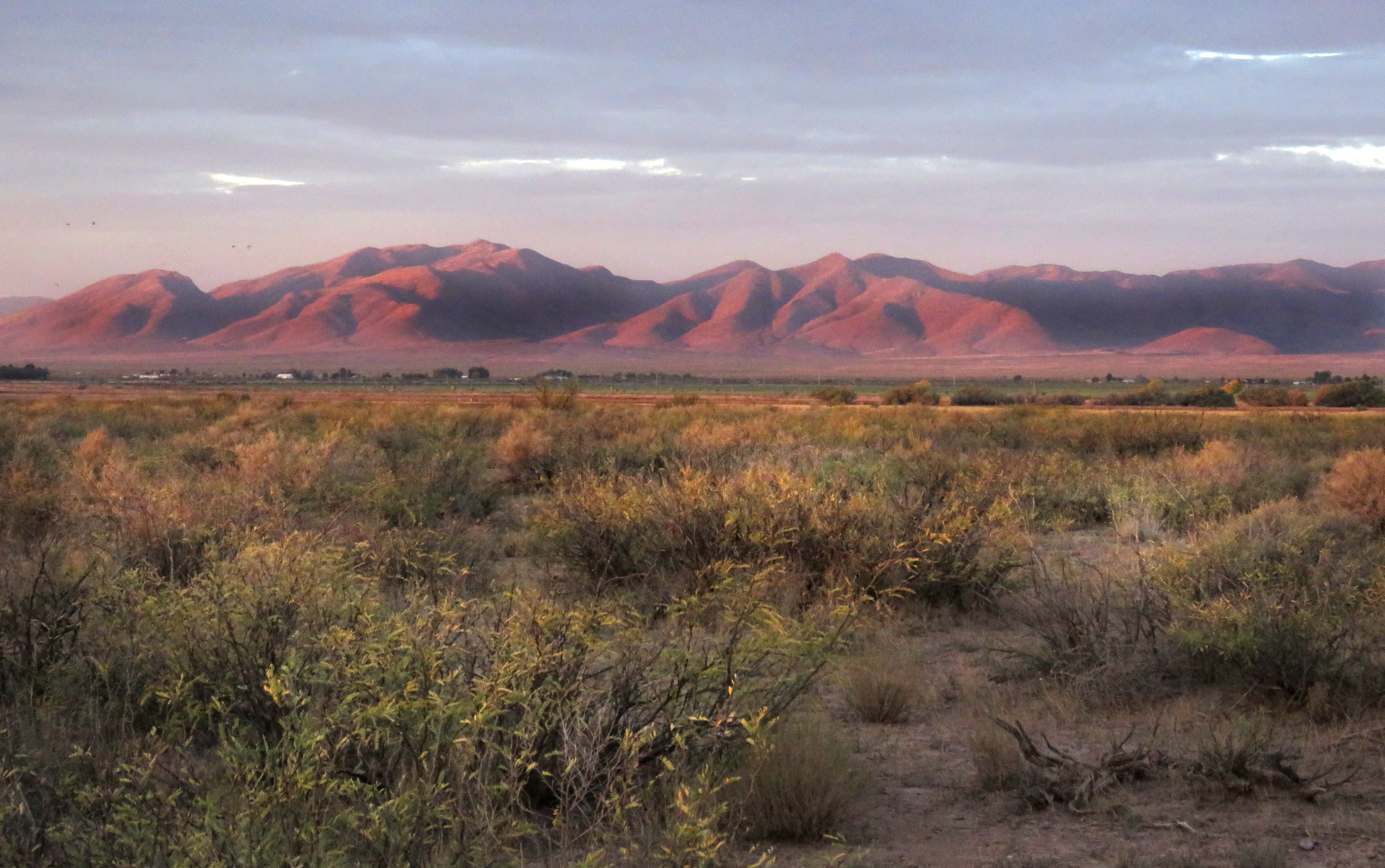
Whitewater Draw valley, Cochise County, Arizona

Whitewater Draw, originally Rio de Agua Prieta, [Spanish: river of dark water], is a tributary stream of the Rio de Agua Prieta in Cochise County, Arizona. It was called Blackwater Creek by Philip St. George Cooke when his command, the Mormon Battalion, camped at a spring on its course on December 5, 1846.

Whitewater Draw has its source at an elevation of 8,520 feet at 31°50′16″N 109°17′49″W in Rucker Canyon in the Chiricahua Mountains in the Coronado National Forest and flows generally westward, skirting the north end of the Swisshelm Mountains, then southwest and south through Sulphur Springs Valley into Mexico at Douglas, Arizona and Agua Prieta to, Sonora, Mexico. There it flows southward as Rio de Agua Prieta then southeast to join the Rio de San Bernardino at an elevation of 3,084 feet / 940 meters, at La Junta de los Rios about 24.5 miles southeast of Douglas, Arizona. The San Bernardino River joins the Bavispe River at Morelos, Sonora at the northern end of the Sierra del Tigre. The Bavispe River flows south by southwest to the Yaqui River and eventually to the Gulf of California at Ciudad Obregon, Sonora.
