= Skeleton Canyon massacres =

1879 and 1881 attacks in Arizona

Coordinates: 31°35′24″N 109°2′10″W

- Date: July 1879 (First massacre); July 1881 (Second massacre)
- Location: Skeleton Canyon, Peloncillo Mountains (Arizona Territory–New Mexico Territory border)
- Participants: Cochise County Cowboys (Outlaw ambushers); Mexican Rurales (1879 victims); Mexican smugglers (1881 victims)
- Outcome: Death of dozens of Mexican officers and smugglers; Theft of silver and cattle by the Cowboys; Escalation of border tensions leading to the Guadalupe Canyon massacre

These events should not be confused with the Skeleton Canyon Shootout in 1896.

The Skeleton Canyon massacres refer to two separate attacks on Mexican citizens in 1879 and 1881. Skeleton Canyon is located in the Peloncillo Mountains (Hidalgo County), which straddles the modern Arizona and New Mexico state line border. This canyon connects the Animas Valley of New Mexico with the San Simon Valley of Arizona.

== 1879 Skeleton Canyon massacre ==
The first Skeleton Canyon Massacre occurred in 1879 when a group of Mexican Rurales were ambushed by cattle rustlers. In July 1879, several rustlers attacked a rancho in northern Sonora, killing several of the inhabitants. After the attack on the rancho, the survivors reported the attacks to Commandant Francisco Neri, who sent out a detachment of Rurales, including Captain Alfredo Carrillo. The Rurales crossed the border into Arizona. As they entered Skeleton Canyon, shots were fired against them. Of the large group that crossed, only three of the Rurales survived.

No action was taken by the Mexican Government, but it protested the killings to President Chester Arthur, although acknowledging the Mexican policemen had crossed into Arizona. Johnny Ringo, considered to be one of an outlaw group known as the Cochise County Cowboys, who were cattle rustlers and bandits, claimed to have been at the ambush. He said others there who participated in the murders were Old Man Clanton, brothers Ike and Billy Clanton, "Curly Bill" Brocius, Florentino Cruz, and brothers Frank and Tom McLaury.

== 1881 Skeleton Canyon massacre ==
In July 1881, "Curly Bill" Brocius learned that several Mexicans carrying silver were heading to Arizona through Skeleton Canyon. Curly Bill and around twenty other men including Johnny Ringo and Jim Crane ambushed the Mexicans, killing four and stealing $4,000 in bullion and livestock. Two months after the attack was reported by the surviving Mexicans, Commandant Neri again sent a detachment of Rurales led by Captain Carrillo across the border. This time, the Rurales successfully ambushed the Cowboys, killing five including Old Man Clanton and Jim Crane, in what became known as the Guadalupe Canyon Massacre.

== In popular culture ==
- In 1958 an episode of the TV series Tombstone Territory portrayed the 1881 attack.
- In 1961, in episode 222 (Season 6/Episode 33), titled "Requiem for Old Man Clanton" of the TV series, "The Life and Legend of Wyatt Earp" mentions the killings in Skeleton Canyon, leading the episode up to the story of what happened in Guadalupe Canyon.
