= Skeleton Canyon treasure =

Alleged treasure located in Skeleton Canyon

The Skeleton Canyon treasure is said to be located in the Peloncillo Mountains within Skeleton Canyon.

The legend was dramatized on a 1990 episode of Unsolved Mysteries.
