= Bavispe River =

Location
- Country: Mexico

Physical characteristics
- Mouth: Yaqui River
  - coordinates: 29.5299°N 109.2385°W

The Rio Bavispe or Bavispe River is a river in Mexico which flows briefly north then mainly south by southwest until it joins with the Aros River to become the Yaqui River, eventually joining the Gulf of California.

== History ==
Historically, the Rio Bavispe valley was the scene of many Apache raids and their skirmishes with the Mexican military. Missionaries settled the upper Bavispe River in the early 1600s.

== Watershed ==
The Bavispe River comprises a large part of the northern Yaqui River watershed. The mainstem of the Bavispe starts in the Sierra Madre Occidental right on the border of Chihuahua, southeast of Huachinera, Sonora, and is formed by the confluence of three rivers at aptly named Três Rios. The Rio Bavispe flows northwest through mountainous country until the upper end of the wide Bavispe Valley. This valley trends northward until making a 180 degree curve west around the Sierra del Tigre. At the north end of the Sierra del Tigre, the Bavispe is joined at Morelos, Sonora by the waters of the Rio San Bernardino (which drain the San Bernardino Valley) whose beginnings are in extreme southeast Cochise County, Arizona. From this confluence the Rio Bavispe turns south by southwest and enters the La Angostura Reservoir (Lázaro Cárdenas Dam), then continues 80 miles further south until it joins with the larger Rio Aros to form the Yaqui River. The Yaqui River enters the Gulf of California at the port city of Guaymas, Sonora.

== Ecology ==
The river hosts an assemblage of native fishes: Yaqui trout, three suckers (Bavispe, Rio Grande, and Yaqui), Mexican stoneroller, roundtail chub, Yaqui catfish, beautiful shiner and longfin dace. Non-native fish include predatory black and yellow bullhead (Ameiras melas and Ameiras natalis).

Important threatened or endangered mammals include the Sonoran pronghorn antelope (Antilocapra americana sonoriensis), Mexican gray wolf (Canis lupus baileyi), jaguar (Panthera onca), ocelot (Leopardus pardalis), jaguarundi (Puma yagouaroundi), and lesser long-nosed bat (Leptonycteris yerbabuenae).

North American beaver (Castor canadensis) were historically native to the Rio Bavispe: Baird reported beavers in Cañon de Guadalupe (at 5,000 ft, affluent of Rio Bavispe) in 1859, Mearns reported them in Cajón Creek (a tributary of Rio Bavispe) in 1907, and Caire observed beaver activity north of Tasaviri (near San Miguelito just west of Morales, Sonora) on the Rio Bavispe mainstem in 1978. A 1999 survey found beaver sign at 14 different sites on the upper Bavispe River mainstem, associated with the presence of cottonwoods (Populus fremontii) and willows (Salix exigua).

== See also ==
- List of rivers of Mexico
