= Cloverdale, New Mexico =

Ghost town in New Mexico, United States

Coordinates: 31.417°N 108.93°W

Cloverdale, New Mexico is a ghost town in the Animas Valley of Hidalgo County. It is believed to be founded in the 1880s.

== Apache-American battle ==
On 28 April 1882, CPTs Tupper and Rafferty led 39 Troopers from G and M Troops, along with 45 Apache Scouts not to far across the Mexican border only 6 miles away from the town of Cloverdale. Here, the command discovered a band of Apache in camp, believing that they were safe from the cavalry so long as they were in Mexico. While the men moved into position, they were spotted by a small food-gathering party, and the fighting commenced. The Apache chief, Loco, called out to the Apache Scouts in an attempt to get them to betray the Americans, but this angered them and they cursed him and fired faster. Having only three rounds per man remaining, CPT Tupper ordered a withdrawal where he was joined by 9 other Troops of the 6th Cavalry under COL James W. Forsyth. The Indians lost 14 warriors killed and 7 women, for the loss of 1 American killed and 2 wounded.

== In fiction ==
In Cormac McCarthy's 1994 novel The Crossing the family home of central character Billy Parham is in Cloverdale in the 1940s.

== See also ==
- List of ghost towns in New Mexico
