= San Bernardino Valley (Arizona) =

Valley in Arizona, United States

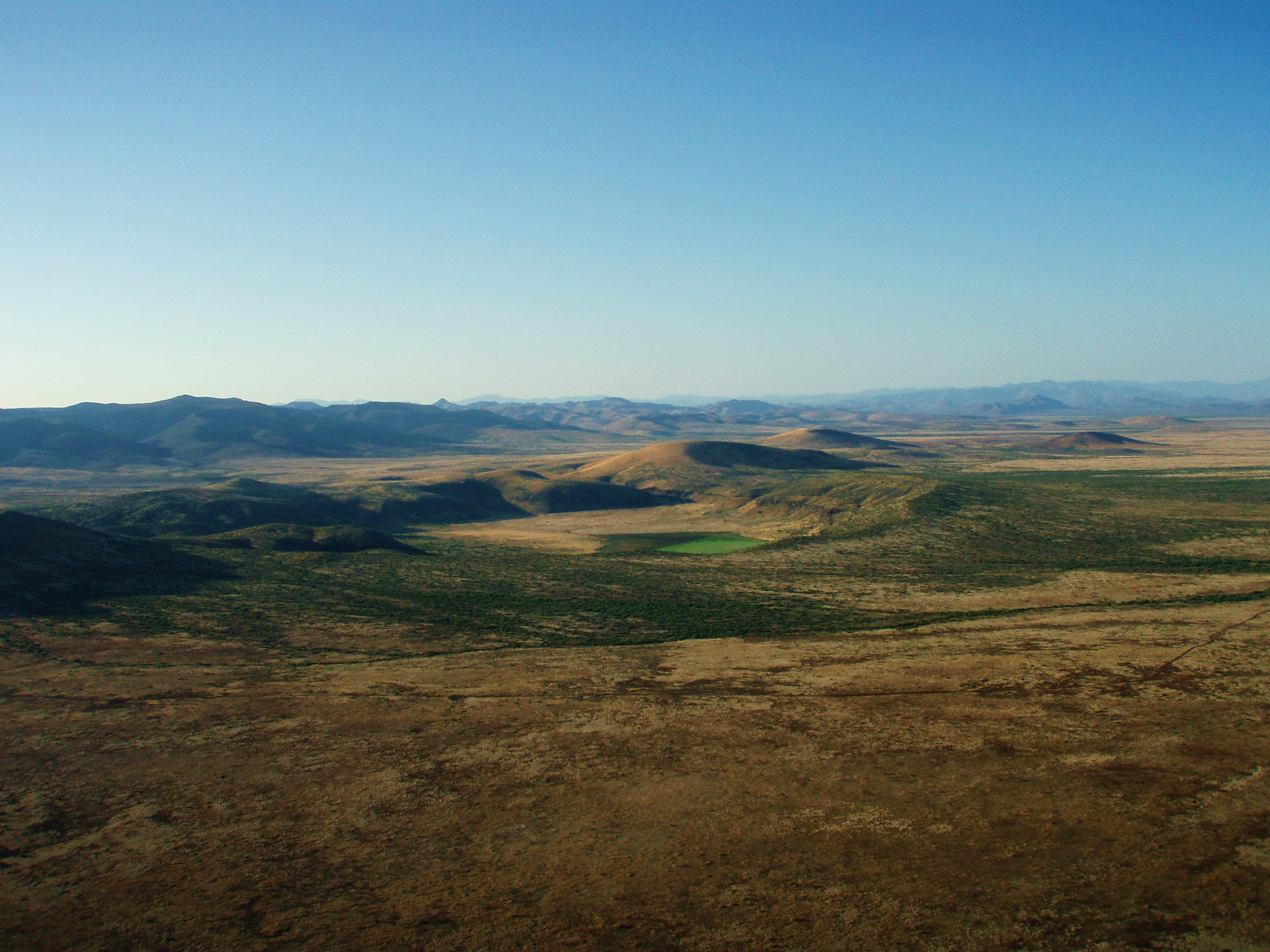
- Paramore Crater

- Location within Arizona
- Length: 35 mi (56 km) NE x SW
- Width: 12 mi (19 km)

Geography
- Country: United States
- State: Arizona
- Regions: Sonoran Desert; Chihuahua Desert
- Counties: Cochise County, Arizona; Hidalgo County, New Mexico
- Communities: Chiricahua, AZ; Bernardino, AZ (historical site)
- Borders on: List: Chiricahua Mountains; San Simon Valley; Peloncillo Mountains; Guadalupe Mountains; San Bernardino National Wildlife Refuge; Sierra del Tigre; Perilla Mountains; Pedrogosa Mountains
- Coordinates: 31°33′25″N 109°10′05″W
- Interactive map of San Bernardino Valley

The San Bernardino Valley of Arizona is a 35 mi (56 km) northeast-by-southwest trending valley in extreme southeast Cochise County, Arizona. The north end of the valley merges into the northwest-by-southeast trending San Simon Valley; both merge in western perimeter Hidaldgo County, New Mexico. The valley is an asymmetric graben.

Valleys border all flanks of the Chiricahua Mountains massif (and some attached sub-ranges); The San Bernardino Valley borders the southeast of the Chiricahua Mountains; the San Simon Valley borders the northeast. San Bernardino Valley abuts the Peloncillo Mountains of New Mexico on the east, and the smaller adjoining range to its south, the Guadalupe Mountains. To the south, the valley borders Sonora, Mexico and the north regions of the Sierra del Tigre range, of Mexico. At the northern end of the Sierra del Tigre, the Rio San Bernardino joins the Bavispe River, then heads south to Mexico. To the northwest and west, the San Bernardino Valley abuts the Chiricahuas, Pedregosa, and Perilla Mountains.

At the very south of the valley, north of Douglas, Arizona–Agua Prieta, Mexico lies the San Bernardino National Wildlife Refuge. The refuge, grasslands, and wetlands are part of the south and southwest-flowing Yaqui River of Mexico that reaches the northeast region of the Gulf of California.

== Geronimo–San Bernardino volcanic field ==
The San Bernardino Valley floor is covered by basaltic lava dating from 0.27 to 1.0 Ma (million years ago). The Geronimo–San Bernardino volcanic field is part of the larger Boot Heel volcanic field.

The field covers some 850 km^{2} and consists of olivine basalt flows, tuff rings and maars with 130 identified volcanic vent areas and cinder cones.
