= High Fives Gang =

Criminal gang active in 1890s in New Mexico, Arizona, Texas and Mexico

- Christian Gang
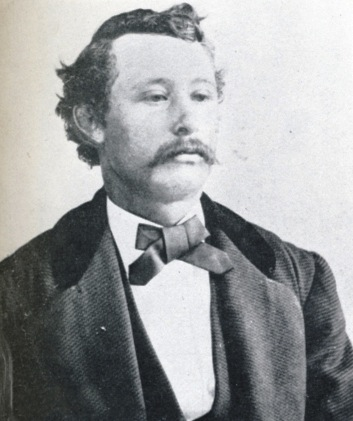
- William "Black Jack" Christian
- Years active: 1890s
- Territory: American Southwest
- Membership: 5
- Leader: "Black Jack" Christian
- Activities: Bank, store, train, and stagecoach robbery; horses and cattle theft

The High Fives gang, also called the Christian Gang, was a group of Oklahoma outlaws that committed numerous crimes in the American Southwest.

The gang robbed banks, stores, trains and stagecoaches along with stealing horses and cattle. Led by William "Black Jack" Christian, their crimes ranged across Arizona, New Mexico and Texas through the 1890s.

== Gang members and their aliases ==
- The leader, William "Black Jack" Christian (202, Ed Williams).
- His brother, Robert "Bob" Christian (Tom Anderson).
- Bob Hayes (John West, Sam Hassells).
- George Musgrave (Jeff Davis, Bill Johnson, Jess Johnson, Jesse Miller, Bob Steward, Jesse Williams).
- Cole "Code" Young (Cole Estes, Bob Harris).

== History ==
In the summer of 1895, the gang was jailed in Guthrie Oklahoma for murdering a police officer. After breaking out of jail that year, they fled to Arizona. The gang continued to commit crimes there for the next two years. A $500 reward was posted for their capture.

Following a failed bank robbery, Sheriff Bob Leatherwood of Tucson Arizona began to track down the gang. However, the outlaws evaded them and took refuge in Mexico.

In 1897, law enforcement learned that the gang had returned to Arizona. A posse was sent to Black Jack Canyon to ambush them. On April 27, 1897, the posse surprised the gang outside of Clifton, Arizona. During the gun battle, William Christian was shot and killed while the rest of the gang escaped. On returning to Clifton, the posse paraded Williams' body around town on a lumber wagon.

== Aftermath ==
The gang split up after Christian's death. Bob Christian went to Mexico and was never heard from again. Musgrave was later captured and tried for his murder of Texas Ranger George Parker. After his acquittal, Musgrave moved to Paraguay, where he became known as the "Gringo cattle rustler". He died there at age 70.
