= Peloncillo Mountains (Hidalgo County) =

Land feature in the southwest United States

- (Little Baldy)
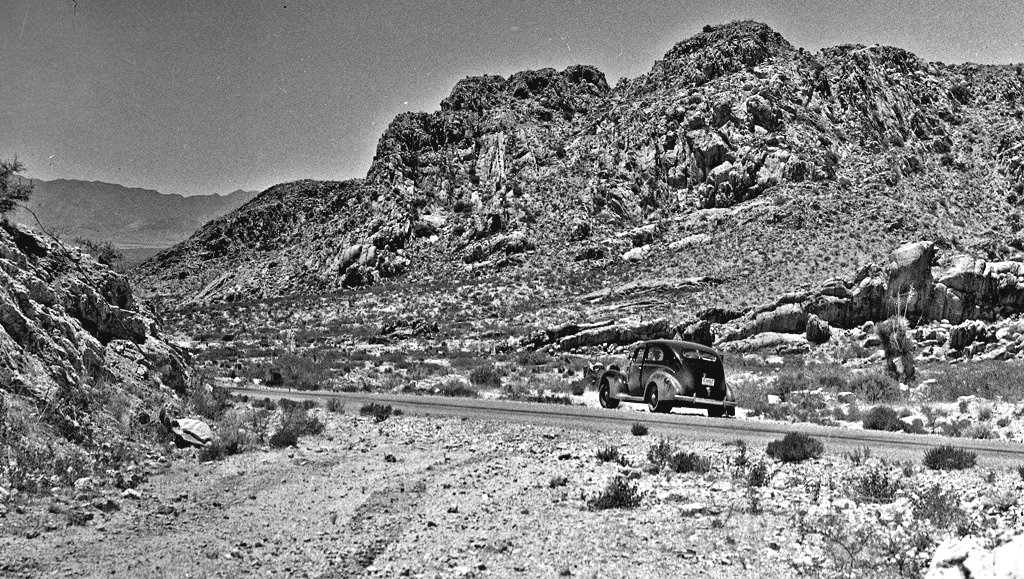
- Mountain pass in northern Peloncillos (1939 photo, west of Lordsburg, NM)

Highest point
- Peak: Gray Mountain
- Elevation: 6,928 ft (2,112 m)
- Coordinates: 31°52′30″N 108°55′22″W

Dimensions
- Length: 35 mi (56 km) N-S
- Width: 12 mi (19 km)

Geography
- Location within New Mexico
- Country: US
- States: New Mexico and Arizona
- Regions: Madrean Sky Islands and Chihuahuan Desert
- Counties: Hidalgo County, NM and Cochise County, AZ
- Cities: Rodeo, NM and Animas, NM
- Range coordinates: 31°52′30″N 108°55′22″W
- Borders on: Animas Mountains, Animas Valley, San Bernardino Valley and Guadalupe Mountains

The Peloncillo Mountains of Hidalgo County, (Spanish language pelo, hair, pelón, hairless, bald; peloncillo, Little Baldy), is a major 35-mile (56 km) long mountain range southwest of New Mexico's Hidalgo County, and also part of the New Mexico Bootheel region. The range continues to the northwest into Arizona as the Peloncillo Mountains of Cochise County, Arizona. The extreme southwest corner of the range also lies in Arizona. It is a linear range bordering the linear San Bernardino Valley of southeast Cochise County, Arizona.

The Peloncillo Mountains lie in a region of southeast Arizona, southwest New Mexico, northeast Sonora, and extreme northwest Chihuahua called the Madrean Sky Islands. They are tall mountain ranges isolated by surrounding flatlands and valleys with sky islands of isolated fauna and flora. Various corridors exist between some ranges; others are mostly isolated. Some ranges are lower elevation, with a reduced variety of habitats.

== Description ==
The Peloncillo Mountains are mostly north-south trending, but curving northeasterly at the north end. They parallel the southwesterly-by-northeast San Bernardino Valley of Arizona, with various canyons and washes draining into the valley.

Historical battles, and Indian Wars caused retreat into this mountain region; it was also access and escape routes into the safe haven ranges of northern Mexico.

The highest peak is Gray Mountain at 6,928 feet (2,112 m). The region is famous for Skeleton Canyon and the historical events, including the surrender of Geronimo, that occurred there.

The Baker Canyon Wilderness is located just south in the connected mountain range, the Guadalupe Mountains.

== Gallery ==
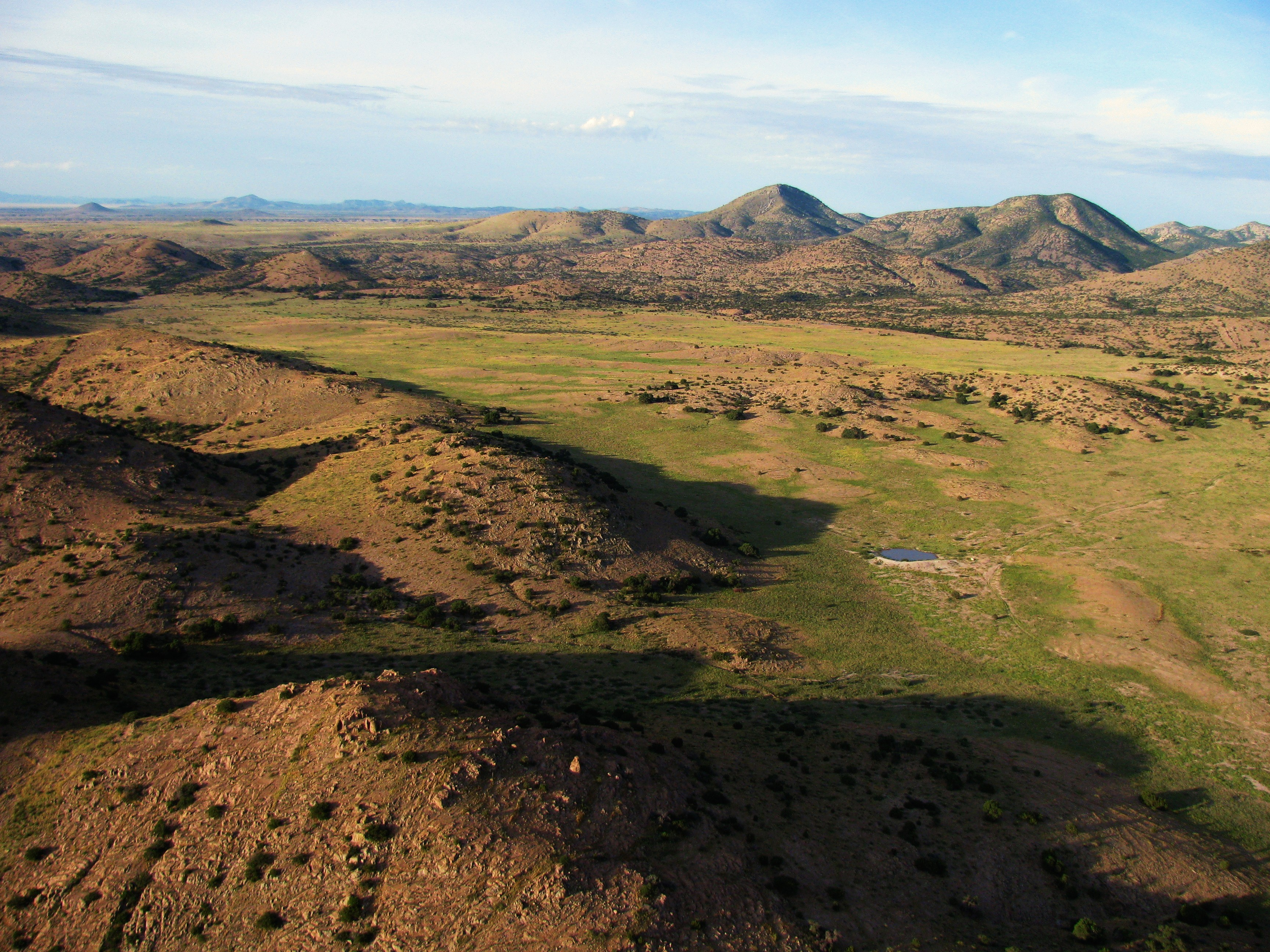
Mt Baldy and Black Mountain beyond Maternity Meadow from Animas Valley

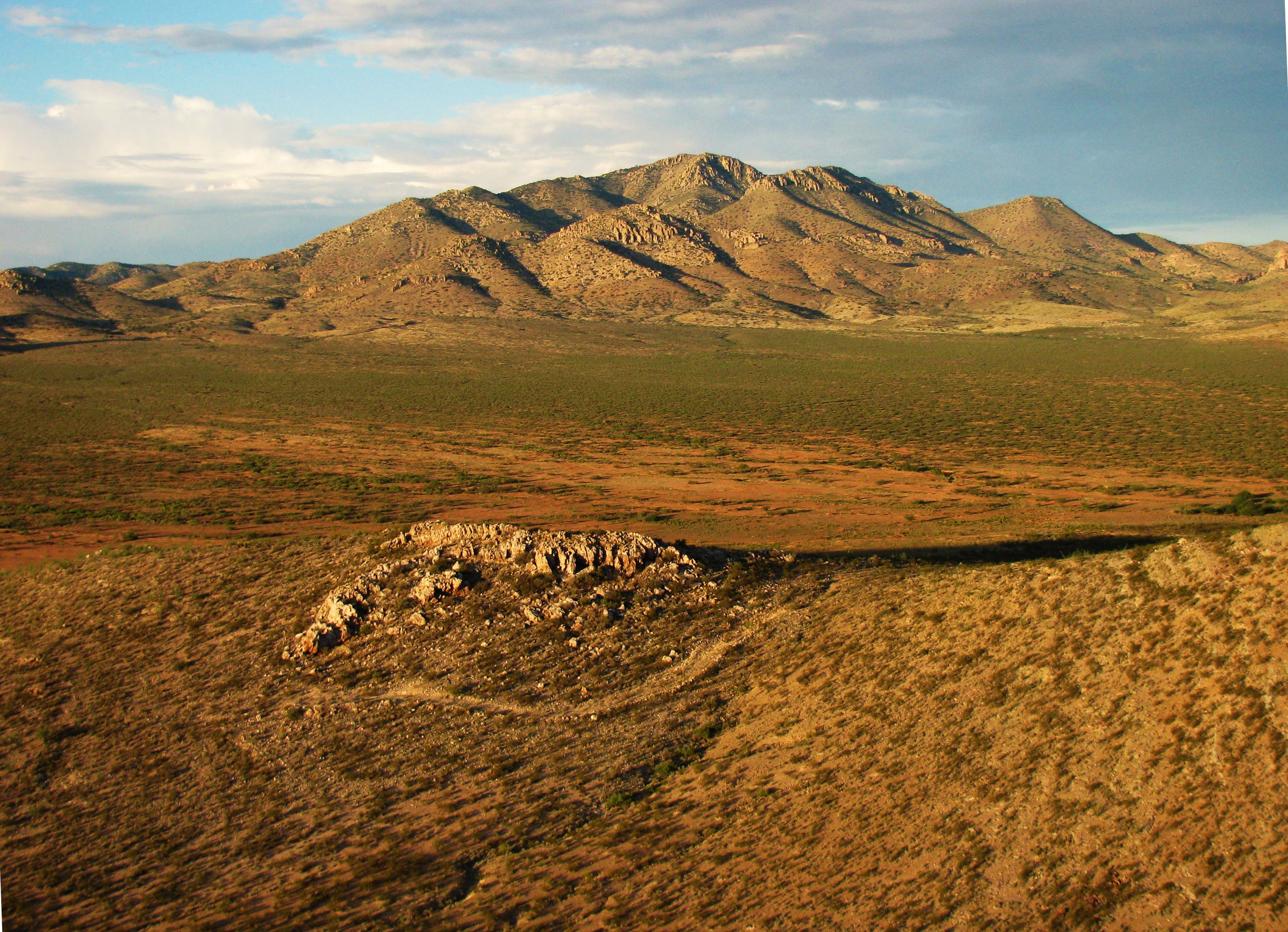
Gray Mountain from Animas Valley

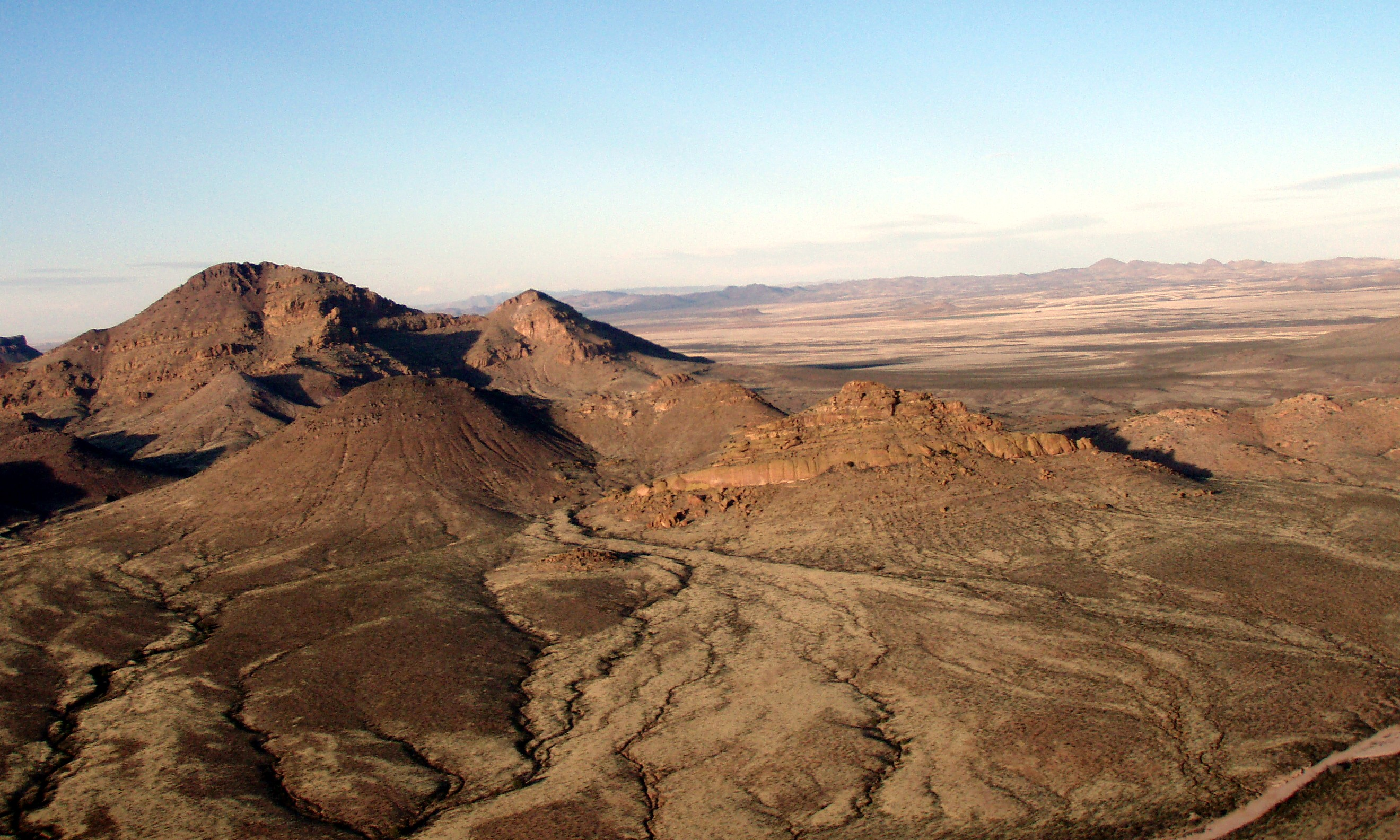
North side of Antelope Pass through the Peloncillo Mountains from the San Simon Valley

== See also ==
- Malpai Borderlands
- Skeleton Canyon Massacre
- Skeleton Canyon treasure
