= New Mexico State Road 146 =

State highway in New Mexico, United States

State Road 146

Route information
- Maintained by NMDOT
- Length: 19.157 mi (30.830 km)
- Existed: 1935–present

Major junctions
- South end: NM 9 in Hachita
- North end: I-10 / US 70 near Wilna

Location
- Country: United States
- State: New Mexico
- Counties: Grant

Highway system
- New Mexico State Highway System; Interstate; US; State; Scenic
← NM 145	→ NM 147

State Road 146 (NM 146) is a 19.157-mile-long (30.830 km), paved, two-lane state highway in Grant County in the U.S. state of New Mexico. NM 146's southern terminus is in Hachita at the road's junction with NM 9. The road's northern terminus is in between Wilna and Separ at the road's junction with Interstate 10 (I-10) and U.S. Route 70 (US 70).

== Route description ==
NM 146 begins at the junction with NM 9 in the village of Hachita. The road heads mostly north through the arid sparsely populated desert plains occupied by ranchos. The highway crosses the Great Continental Divide after approximately 6.2 miles (10.0 km). Continuing north NM 146 arrives at I-10, crosses it over a 235.9-foot-long (71.9 m) bridge, built in 1958 before reaching its northern terminus at intersection with the westbound ramps on the north side of I-10 and US 70.

== History ==
A road connecting Hachita to the old US 80 east of Separ first appears on the 1935 map as Route 81. In 1939-1940 the road was extended south all the way to Antelope Wells. The segment corresponding to the current NM 146 was paved some time in mid-1950s, while the southern stretch south of Hachita remained "graded". In 1988 the New Mexico Department of Transportation (NMDOT) went through a radical road renumbering program, and the stretch from Hachita to I-10 became known as NM 146, whereas the southern section remained NM 81.

== Major intersections ==
The entire route is in Grant County.

Location	mi	km	Destinations	Notes
Hachita	0.000	0.000	NM 9 – Animas, Columbus	Southern terminus
Wilna	19.157	30.830	I-10 / US 70 – Lordsburg, Deming	Northern terminus, I-10 exit 49
1.000 mi = 1.609 km; 1.000 km = 0.621 mi

== In popular culture ==
NM 146 was mentioned in Better Call Saul.
