= New Mexico State Road 80 =

State highway in Hidalgo County, New Mexico, United States

State Road 80
- NM 80 highlighted in red

Route information
- Maintained by NMDOT
- Length: 32.416 mi (52.168 km)
- Existed: 1989–present
- History: The entire route is a section of former US 80

Major junctions
- South end: SR 80 at the Arizona state line near Rodeo
- NM 533 near Rodeo; NM 9 near Rodeo; NM 145 at Blue Mountain
- North end: I-10 at Road Forks

Location
- Country: United States
- State: New Mexico
- Counties: Hidalgo

Highway system
- New Mexico State Highway System; Interstate; US; State; Scenic
← US 80	→ NM 81

State Road 80 (NM 80) is 32.416-mile-long (52.168 km) north–south state road in southwestern New Mexico, between the Arizona state line near Rodeo and Interstate 10 (I-10) at Road Forks. Lying entirely within Hidalgo County, New Mexico, it is the only section of the old U.S. Route 80 (US 80) in New Mexico which still retains its number. The route was re-designated NM 80 in 1989. This is the reason why NM 80 has an even number designation despite the highway being north/south. From the south, SR 80 acts as a continuation of NM 80 into Arizona.

== Route description ==
Despite being an even-numbered highway, NM 80 is signed as a north–south route. This is because NM 80 takes its number from the now-defunct US 80, which was an east–west highway, as well as the fact that the highway continues as SR 80 into Arizona. NM 80 begins at the Arizona state line and eastern terminus of Arizona State Route 80. The highway travels northeast alongside the town of Rodeo. On the north side of the highway is the now abandoned track bed of the former El Paso and Southwestern Railroad. On the northeast end of town at Shady Lane, Rivers Road curves off to the northeast. This older section of US 80 used to lead to a railroad overpass, when the EP&SW was still operational. After the line was abandoned, US 80, now NM 80, was rerouted to a gentle curve bisecting the old track bed. The old overpass has long since been demolished. NM 80 travels straight north from this point on.

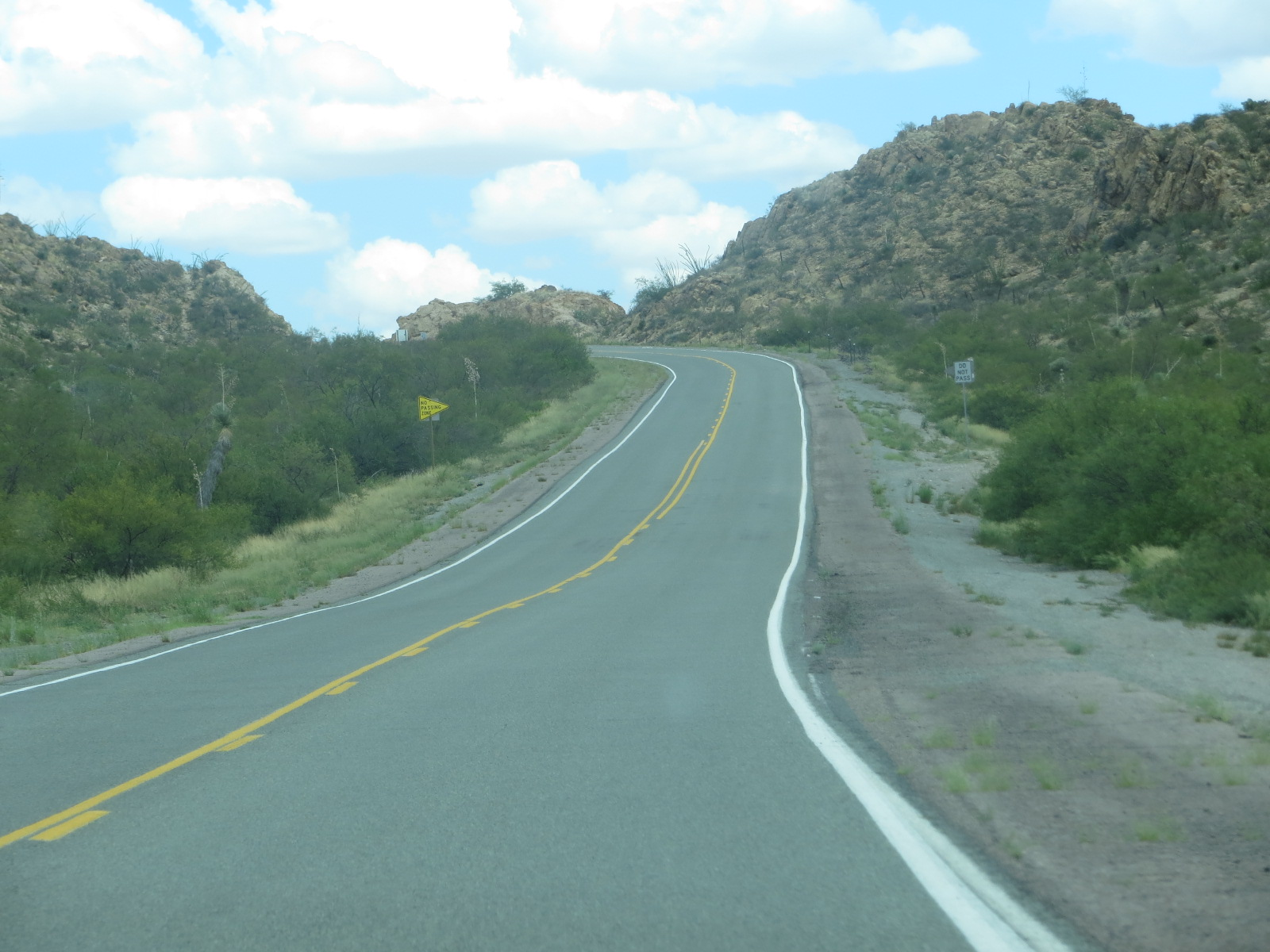
NM 80 northbound through Granite Gap.

8 miles from the Arizona border, NM 80 intersects the eastern terminus of NM 533. Four miles north of NM 533 is the western terminus of NM 9, which heads east to Animas and Columbus. Continuing north, NM 80 passes Rodeo Airport, then curves northeast, skirting the base of both Granite Peak and Blue Mountain. At the eastern base of Blue Mountain is the western terminus of NM 143. NM 80 then makes a straight shot north through a desolate flat desert landscape until it reaches Roadforks. The small unincorporated area has a few service stations and small businesses for both NM 80 and I-10 travelers. NM 80 continues for a few hundred feet north, before ending in a trumpet interchange at I-10 Exit 5. While NM 80 ends here, US 80 would have continued east along much of the current route of I-10 to the Texas border.

== History ==
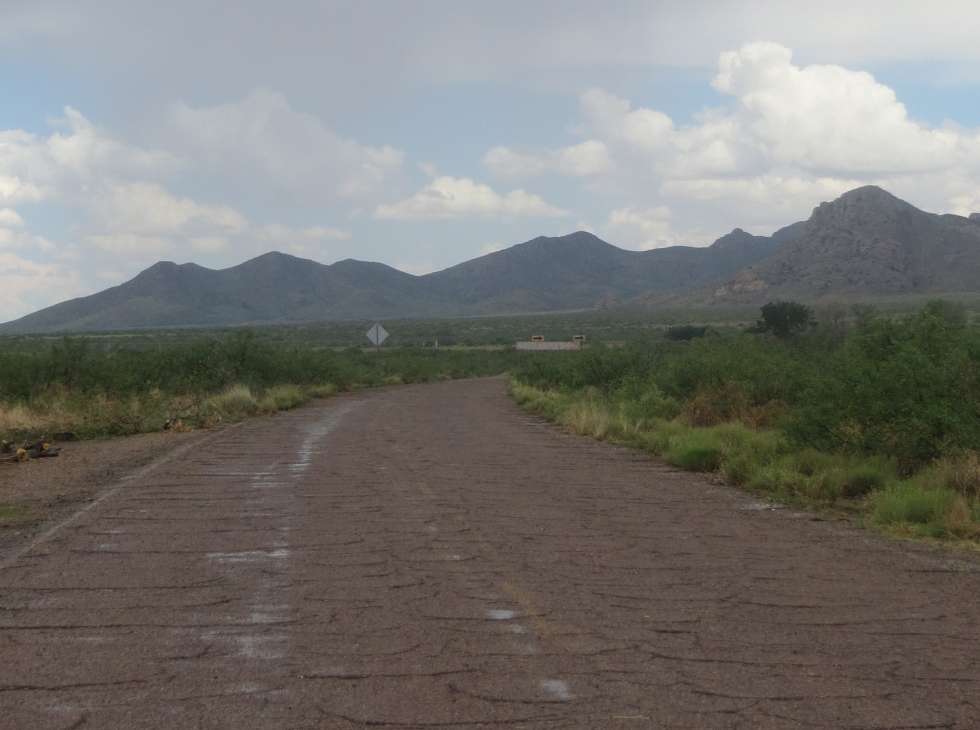
An abandoned section of US 80 (Rivers Road) in Rodeo. This was formerly the western approach of a railroad overpass, which has since been torn down.

In 1903, New Mexico Territorial Road 4 (NM 4) was designated from the Arizona border near Rodeo through Lordsburg and Deming to NM 1 in Las Cruces. Upon creation of New Mexico's first state highway system in 1912, NM 4 was re-designated as New Mexico State Road 4. In Lordsburg, NM 4 passed the western terminUS of NM 42, which ran northeast to NM 11 in Silver City. In 1917 the Dixie Overland Highway auto trail was designated between San Diego, California and Savannah, Georgia over part of NM 4. The Dixie Overland Highway was joined by the Bankhead Highway in 1920 and the Old Spanish Trail in 1923. In 1923, NM 4 was truncated to Lordsburg, and NM 42 extended over its former route to Arizona.

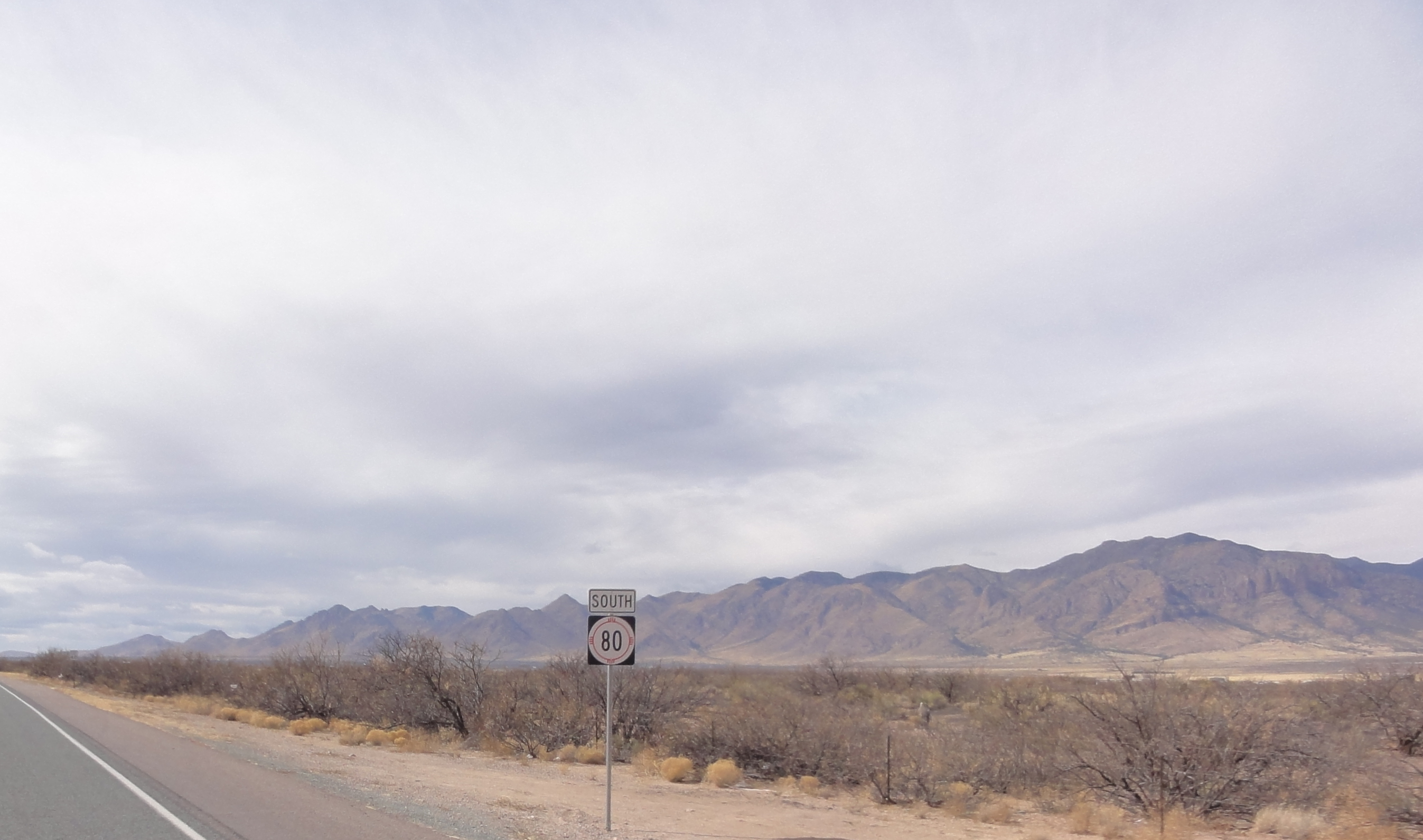
NM 80 southbound

On November 11, 1926, the U.S. Numbered Highway System was established in a joint effort by the United States Department of Agriculture and the American Association of State Highway Officials. NM 42 became part of U.S. Route 80 from Arizona to Lordsburg and U.S. Route 180 from Lordsburg to Silver City. Nationally, US 80 ran from San Diego to Savannah, replacing the earlier auto trails designated along NM 4 and NM 42. US 180 ran from Florence Junction, Arizona to the new U.S. Route 85 northeast of Silver City via Lordsburg. The arrival of the U.S. Highways in New Mexico caused the New Mexico State Highway Department to institute a statewide remembering in 1927 to better include the new routes. As such, NM 42 and the remainder of NM 4 were entirely removed from the state highway system in favor of US 80 and US 180. The route between Arizona and Lordsburg would continue to hold the US 80 designation for the next 63 years.

Following the creation of the Interstate Highway System in 1956, Interstate 10 slowly replaced US 80. Starting in 1964, US 80 was truncated eastward in increments from San Diego. in 1989, Arizona and New Mexico requested AASHTO to remove US 80 west of Anthony, New Mexico. The request was approved. The remaining section of US 80 from Benson, Arizona to Roadforks became Arizona State Route 80 and New Mexico State Road 80 respectively. The remainder of US 80 was removed from New Mexico in 1991.

== Major intersections ==
The entire route is in Hidalgo County.

Location	mi	km	Destinations	Notes
Rodeo	0.000	0.000	SR 80 west / Historic US 80 west – Douglas	Continuation into Arizona
Rodeo	4.608	7.416	NM 533 west	Eastern terminus of NM 533
	8.044	12.946	NM 9 east – Animas	Western terminus of NM 9
	24.205	38.954	NM 145 east – Cotton City	Western terminus of NM 145
Road Forks	32.416	52.168	I-10 – Lordsburg, Tucson	Northern terminus; Exit 5 on I-10; trumpet interchange
1.000 mi = 1.609 km; 1.000 km = 0.621 mi

== See also ==
- List of state roads in New Mexico
