= New Mexico State Road 1113 =

Highway in New Mexico

State Road 1113
- North Playas Road
- NM 1113 highlighted in red

Route information
- Maintained by NMDOT
- Length: 5.325 mi (8.570 km)
- Existed: December 12, 1995–present

Major junctions
- South end: End of state maintenance in Playas
- North end: NM 9 near Windmill

Location
- Country: United States
- State: New Mexico
- Counties: Hidalgo

Highway system
- New Mexico State Highway System; Interstate; US; State; Scenic
| ← NM 615 | → NM 2001 |

State Road 1113 (NM 1113) is an approximately 5.3-mile-long (8.5 km) state highway in the US state of New Mexico. NM 1113's southern terminus is at the end of state maintenance in Playas, and the northern terminus is at NM 9 east of Windmill. NM 1113 is one of only three four-digit state highways in New Mexico (the others being NM 5001 and NM 6563).

== History ==
NM 1113 was originally Hidalgo County Route 113 but was transferred to the state on December 12, 1995 in a road exchange agreement.

== Major intersections ==
The entire route is in Hidalgo County.

| Location | mi | km | Destinations | Notes |
|---|---|---|---|---|
| | 0.000 | 0.000 | NM 9 | Northern terminus |
| Playas | 5.325 | 8.570 | End of state maintenance | Southern terminus |
1.000 mi = 1.609 km; 1.000 km = 0.621 mi
