= New Mexico State Road 145 =

Highway in New Mexico

State Road 145
- Goat Camp Road

Route information
- Maintained by NMDOT
- Length: 3.500 mi (5.633 km)
- Existed: 1988–present

Major junctions
- West end: NM 80 near Cotton City
- East end: NM 338 near Cotton City

Location
- Country: United States
- State: New Mexico
- Counties: Hidalgo

Highway system
- New Mexico State Highway System; Interstate; US; State; Scenic
← NM 144	→ NM 146

State Road 145 (NM 145) is a 3.500-mile-long (5.633 km), paved, two-lane state highway in Hidalgo County in the U.S. state of New Mexico. NM 145's western terminus is at the road's junction with NM 80, right after the road turns north passing through Peloncillo Mountains. The road's eastern terminus is north of Cotton City at the highway's junction with NM 338. NM 145 is also known as Goat Camp Road.

== Route description ==
NM 145 begins at the junction with NM 80, right after the road passes through the southern edge of Peloncillo Mountains, skirting the old lead mines. The road heads east through the arid sparsely populated desert plains occupied by ranchos. After 3.5 miles the road reaches its eastern terminus at the intersection with NM 338, just north of Cotton City.

== History ==
The old Route 145 was created some time in 1930s, running from Route 184 near Black Springs to its intersection with Route 52. Shortly thereafter, Route 145 together with several other roads in the area were combined to form an extension of Route 78 which existed until 1988. After reorganization of 1988, the route was renamed NM 163.

A road connecting NM 80 to NM 338 first appears on the mid-1960s topographic maps, as a local paved highway. In 1988 the New Mexico Department of Transportation (NMDOT) went through a radical road renumbering program, and the local road was transferred to the State control, and designated as NM 145.

== Major intersections ==
The entire route is in Hidalgo County.

Location	mi	km	Destinations	Notes
	0.000	0.000	NM 80 – Road Forks, Rodeo	Western terminus
Cotton City	3.500	5.633	NM 338 – Animas	Eastern terminus
1.000 mi = 1.609 km; 1.000 km = 0.621 mi
