= New Mexico State Road 9 =

State highway in New Mexico, United States

State Road 9
- NM 9 highlighted in red

Route information
- Maintained by NMDOT
- Length: 109.154 mi (175.666 km)

Major junctions
- West end: NM 80 near Rodeo
- NM 338 in Animas; NM 113 near Windmill; NM 146 in Hachita; NM 81 in Hachita; NM 11 in Columbus
- East end: CR A003 at the Doña Ana county line

Location
- Country: United States
- State: New Mexico
- Counties: Hidalgo, Grant, Luna

Highway system
- New Mexico State Highway System; Interstate; US; State; Scenic
← NM 8	→ I-10

State Road 9 (NM 9) is a 109.154-mile-long (175.666 km) state road in the U.S. state of New Mexico. The highway spans Hidalgo, Grant, and Luna counties from its western terminus at NM 80 to its eastern terminus at CR A003 at the Doña Ana county line. NM 9 and NM 338 are the only remaining New Mexico State Roads to form a concurrency.

== Route description ==
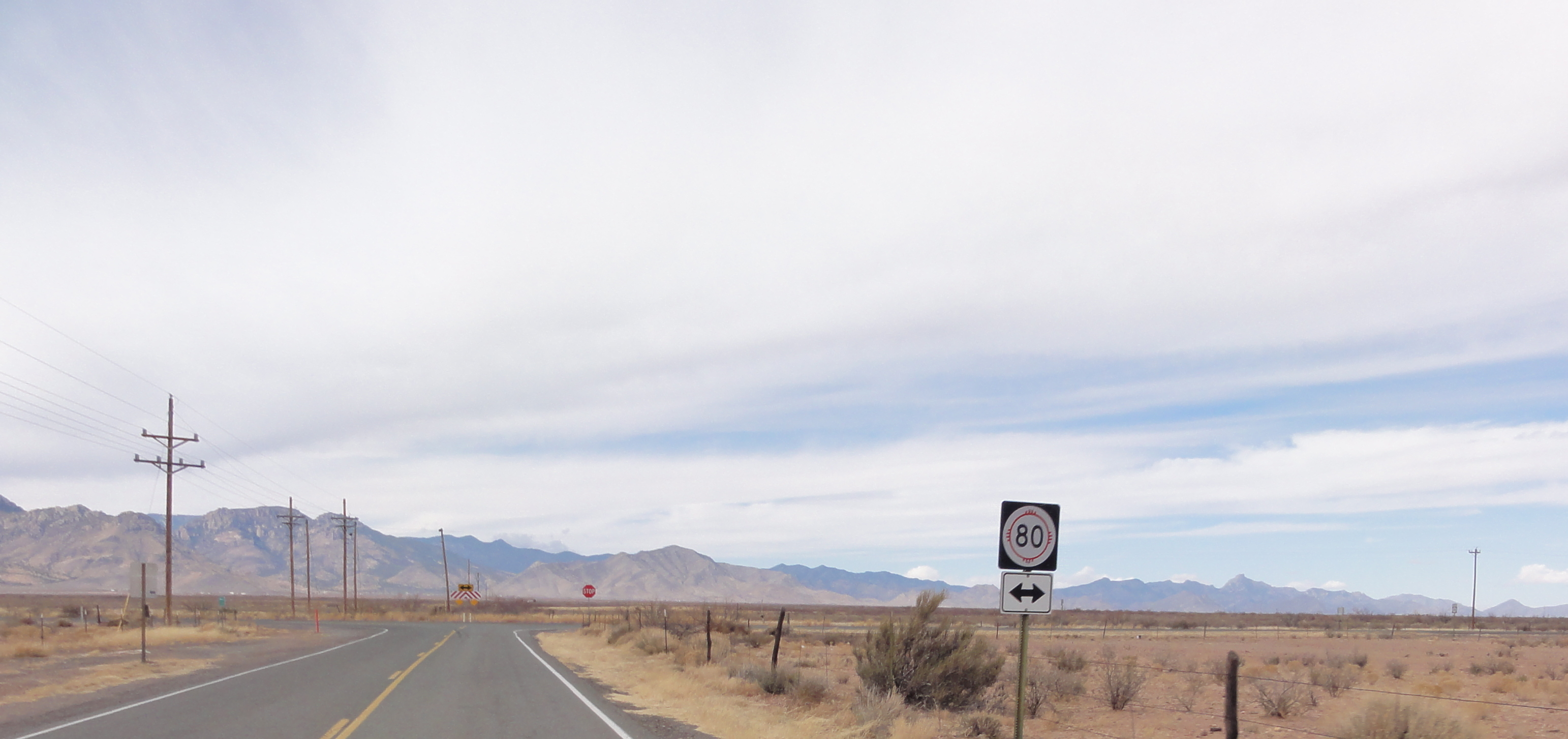
NM 9 approaching its terminus at NM 80

NM 9 highway generally follows the abandoned railway line built in 1901-02 by El Paso & South Western as the route from Douglas, through New Mexico to El Paso. The railroad was abandoned in 1961 due to lack of cargo, and the railroad tracks were removed a year later.

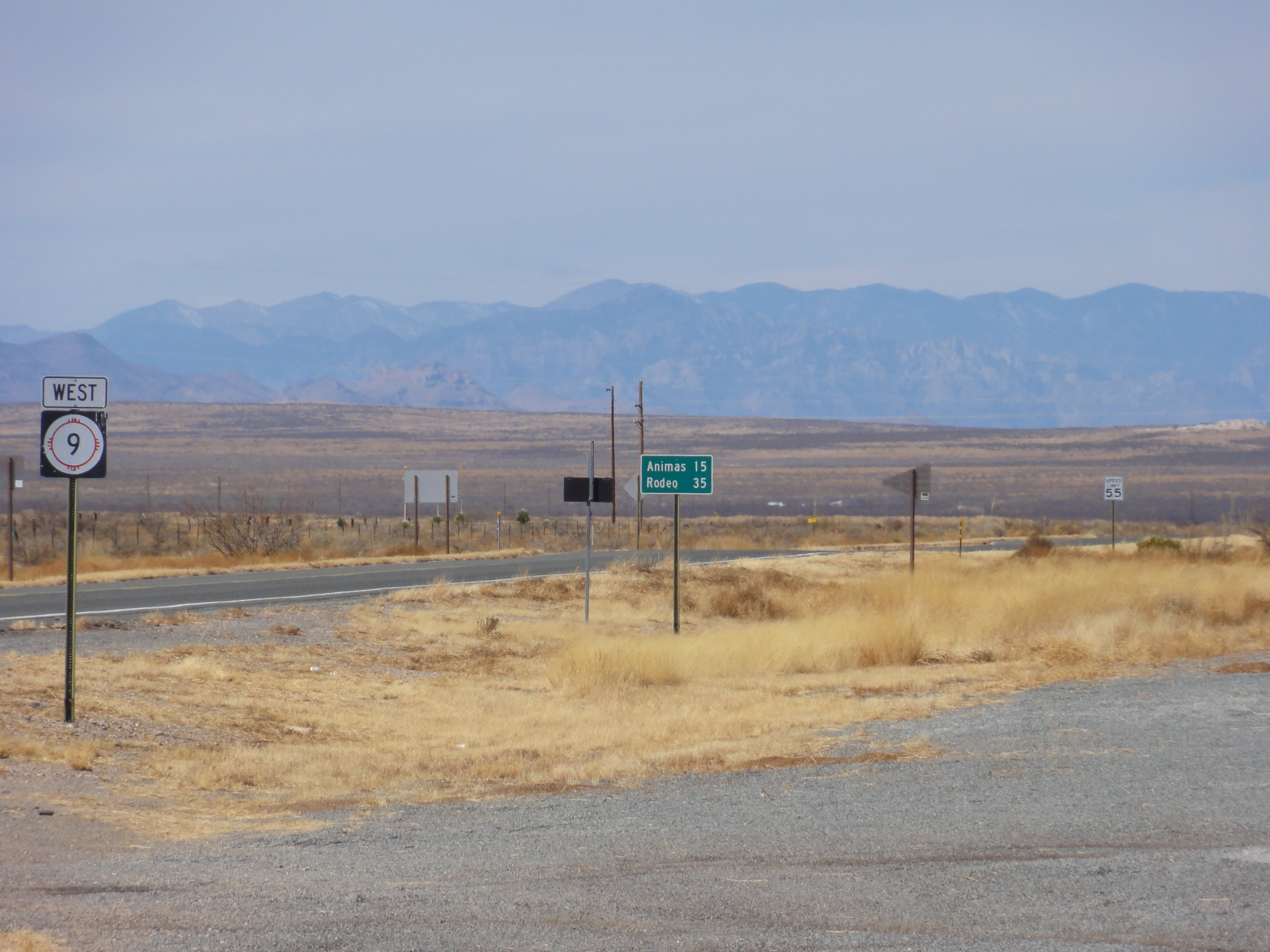
NM 9 westbound, 15 miles from Animas

The highway's western terminus is at NM 80 north of Rodeo, in the San Simon Valley close to the border with Arizona. The route then climbs through Antelope Pass, a gap in the Peloncillo Mountains, into the Animas Valley where it intersects with NM 338 in the town of Animas. A few miles east of Animas, the road again climbs and crosses the Continental Divide the first of three times, then intersects with NM 113 (which goes northbound to I-10). Continuing east, the road crosses the Continental Divide twice in less than 2 miles (3 km), then descends to the Hachita Valley.

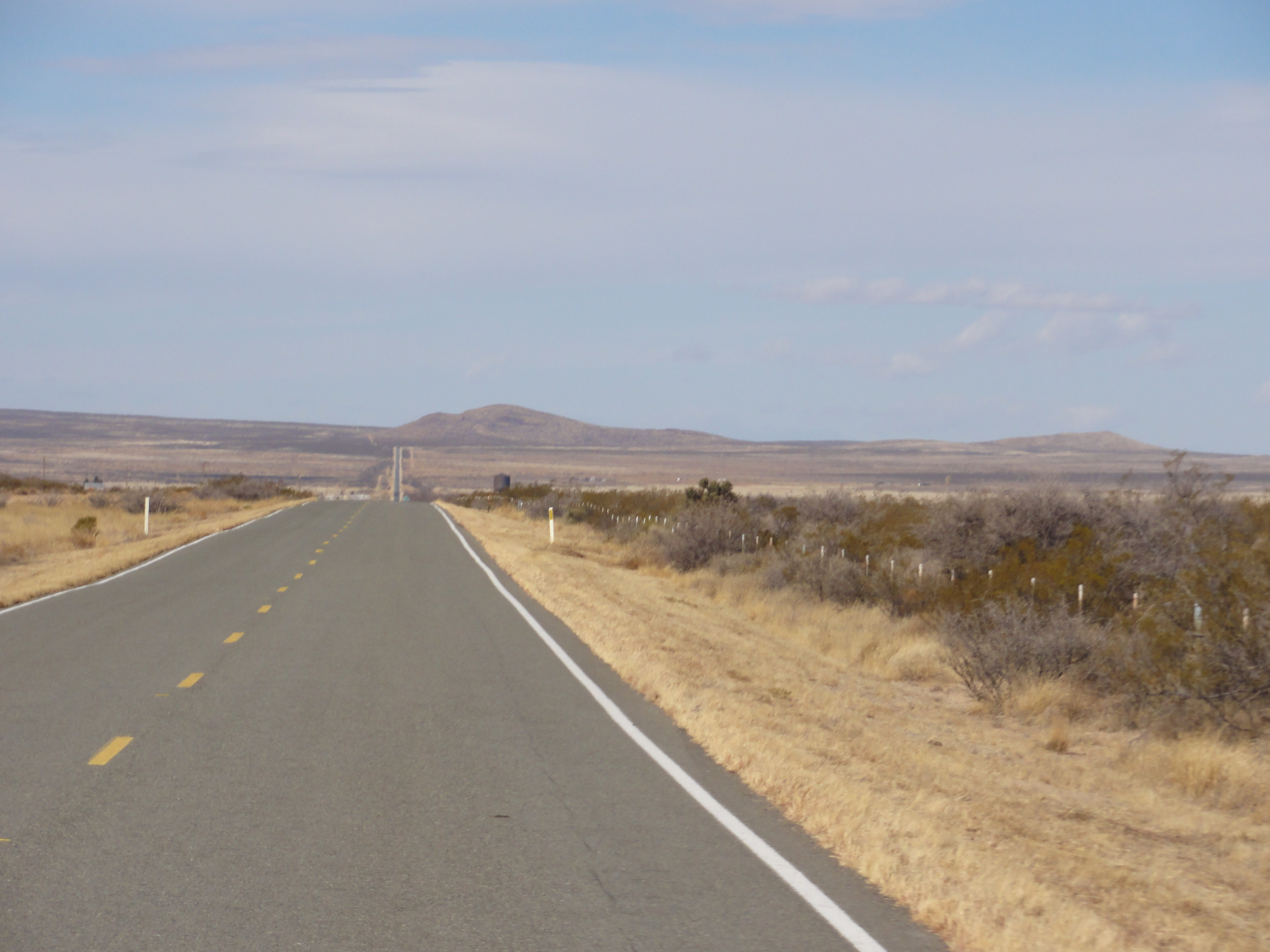
NM 9 slightly east of Hachita

In Hachita, the road intersects first with NM 146 (which goes northbound to I-10), then with NM 81 (which goes south to Antelope Wells, and into Mexico). From Hachita, NM 9 continues ESE, then generally East to Columbus, where it intersects with NM 11 (which goes north to Deming and south to Puerto Palomas). East of Columbus, NM 9 stays within 3 miles (4.8 km) of the Mexican border. NM 9 officially ends at the Dona Ana County line, but the road continues as Dona Ana County Road A003 to the Pete Domenici Highway (NM 136) just west of El Paso.

== Major intersections ==
County	Location	mi	km	Destinations	Notes
Hidalgo		0.000	0.000	NM 80 – Rodeo, Road Forks	Western terminus
Hidalgo	Animas	13.882	22.341	NM 338 south	Western end of NM 338 concurrency
Hidalgo	Animas	14.026	22.573	NM 338 north – Cotton City	Eastern end of NM 338 concurrency
Hidalgo		28.681	46.158	NM 1113 south (Smelter Road) – Playas	Northern terminus of NM 1113
Hidalgo		28.773	46.306	NM 113 north (Muir Road) to I-10	Southern terminus of NM 113
Grant	Hachita	44.117	70.999	NM 146 north	Southern terminus of NM 146
Grant	Hachita	50.663	81.534	NM 81 south – Antelope Wells	Northern terminus of NM 81; to Mexico-U.S. border at Antelope Wells
Luna	Columbus	87.865	141.405	NM 11 (Columbus Road) – Columbus, Puerto Palomas, Chih.	
Luna–Doña Ana county line		109.154	175.666	CR A003 – Santa Teresa	Eastern terminus, roadway continues as CR A003 to Santa Teresa
1.000 mi = 1.609 km; 1.000 km = 0.621 mi: Concurrency terminus

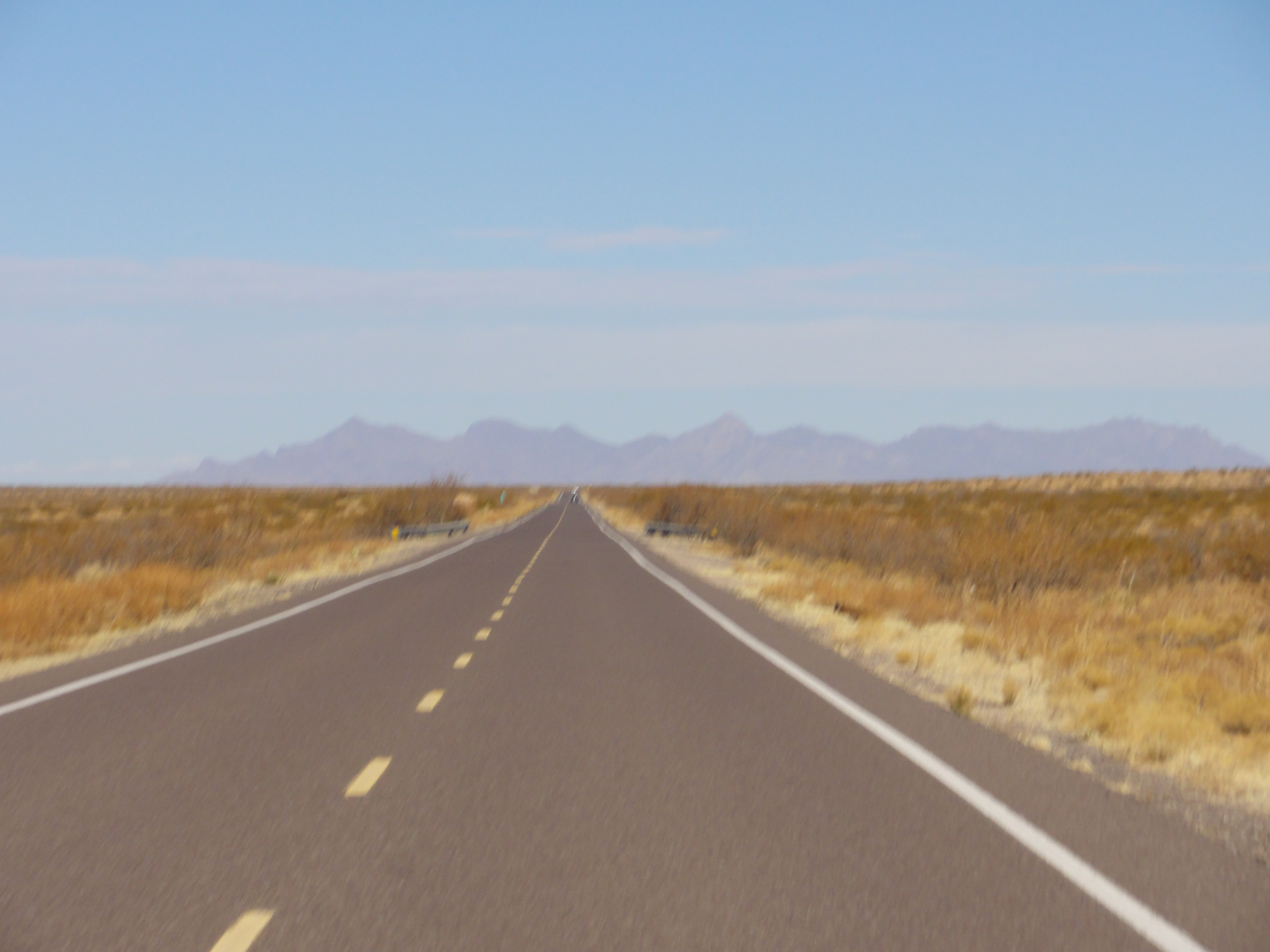
NM 9 slightly east of Arena

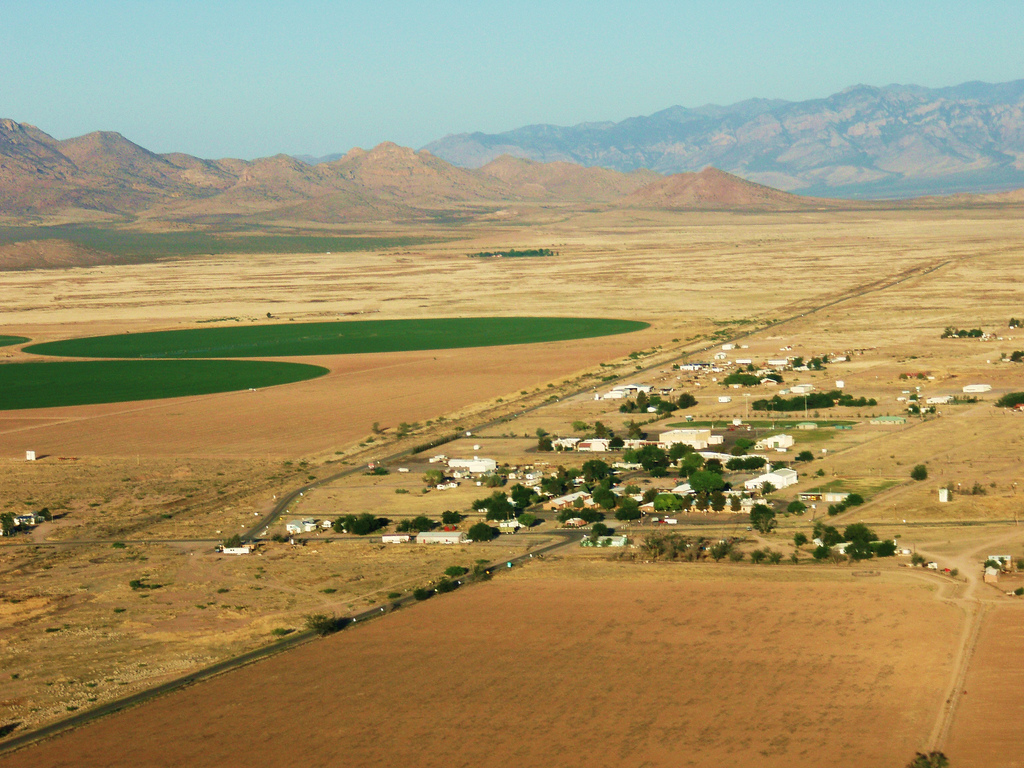
West looking view, (Animas & north Animas Valley), of State Road 9, Chiricahua Mountains massif, of Arizona on horizon. (north perimeter of New Mexico Bootheel
