= Great Divide Mountain Bike Route =

Cycle route in Canada and the United States

The Great Divide Mountain Bike Route (GDMBR) is a 3,083.8 mi (4,962.9 km), off-road bicycle touring route between Jasper, Alberta, Canada and Antelope Wells, New Mexico, USA. Completed in 1997, the GDMBR was developed by Adventure Cycling Association, who continue to maintain highly detailed route maps and a guidebook.

== Route description ==
Following the Continental Divide as closely as practicable and crossing it 30 times, about 90% of the GDMBR is on unpaved roads and trails and requires basic off-pavement riding skills to complete. The unpaved portions of the route range from high quality dirt or gravel roads to singletrack mountain bike trails to a few short sections of unmaintained trails which may not be ridable. The total elevation gain on the GDMBR is over 200,000 ft (61,000 m). While most of the GDMBR is on unpaved surfaces, the route does not require highly technical mountain bike riding skills. The route has been designed to provide a riding experience primarily on very low trafficked roads through mostly undeveloped areas of the Rocky Mountain west.

The GDMBR is routed through a variety of terrain and geographic features. Highlights include the Flathead Valley in Montana; Grand Teton National Park and the Great Divide Basin in Wyoming; South Park and Boreas Pass in Colorado; and Polvadera Mesa and the Gila Wilderness in New Mexico. Colorado's Indiana Pass, at 11,913 ft (3,631 m), is the highest point on the route. On route, the rider will encounter isolated river valleys, mountain forests, wide open grasslands, high desert, and, near the end of the ride, a section of the Chihuahuan Desert. The GDMBR passes through some larger towns, including Helena and Butte, Montana; Pinedale and Rawlins, Wyoming; Steamboat Springs, Breckenridge, Salida, and Del Norte, Colorado; and Grants and Silver City, New Mexico. Otherwise, only extremely small towns will be encountered, limiting the variety of goods and services available to riders.

Antelope Wells, New Mexico is the most commonly known starting or finishing point of the Continental Divide trail, but due to its remote location devoid of any lodging or services, Columbus, New Mexico, is an alternate starting or finishing point for those hiking or biking the Continental Divide trail. Located 3 miles from the International Port of Entry at Palomas, Mexico, Columbus is a small border village with such amenities as two modest hotels, a gas station, a handful of small cafes, a post office, bank, mechanics, and groceries.

== Riding the GDMBR ==
The route is most commonly ridden from north to south. Southbound riders normally cannot start prior to mid-June nor later than the end of September. Typical times to ride the entire route range from six to ten weeks.

Logistical issues complicate riding the GDMBR. Reliable food and water sources on some portions of the route are over 100 mi (160 km) apart. Unpredictable mountain and desert weather can bring snow, rain, high winds, and temperature extremes at any time of year. It is also not uncommon to encounter large mammals including grizzly and black bears, moose, and occasionally cougars.

Due to the possibility of deep snow in the mountains and monsoon rains in New Mexico, careful attention to weather and climate is required to ensure the rider can complete the route without having to wait out impassable conditions. On portions of the route, rain can turn some sections of dirt roads into quagmires of adhesive mud. The only options for the rider to pass these obstacles are to wait for the roads to dry or to carry their bike.

As much of the route is not signposted, good navigation skills are also necessary. Riders should be self-sufficient and carry camping equipment as commercial lodging is not available for long stretches of the route. It is also helpful to be skilled in bike maintenance and repair.

For all the challenges, properly prepared and equipped riders can expect to have an enjoyable and adventurous experience. In 2009, National Geographic Adventure listed riding the GDMBR as one of its top 100 best American adventures.

== Racing ==
The Tour Divide Race is a self-supported, underground race that follows the entirety of the GDMBR. Another race on the GDMBR, the Great Divide Race, used only the U.S. portion of the route and appears to have been defunct since its last race in 2010.

In the Tour Divide, the race clock runs 24 hours a day and the riders are allowed no outside support other than access to public facilities such as stores, motels, and bike shops. The “official” record time to complete the Tour Divide is 13 days, 22 hours, and 51 minutes and was set in 2016 by British endurance racer Mike Hall. In 2023, EF Education-EasyPost racer Lachlan Morton set a time of 12 days, 12 hours, and 21 minutes. The route for the Tour Divide has changed over the years and Lachlan's route was approximately 42 miles shorter than Mike Hall's. The Tour Divide has been raced and completed on both single speed bicycles and tandem bicycles. The race, which has neither entry fees nor prizes, usually starts on the second Friday in June at an event called Grand Départ. The race can also be completed at any time as an individual time trial.

== Provinces and States on the Great Divide Mountain Bike Route ==
1. Alberta
2. British Columbia
3. Colorado
4. Idaho
5. Montana
6. New Mexico
7. Wyoming

== See also ==
- Adventure Cycling Association GDMBR map
- Adventure Cycling Route Network
- Ride the Divide, the web site about the film
- Mixed Terrain Cycle-Touring
- TourDivide.org/ a web site about the annual race
- Sample gear list and an autobiographical movie on the race
