= New Mexico State Road 113 =

State highway in New Mexico, United States

State Road 113

Route information
- Maintained by NMDOT
- Length: 20.602 mi (33.156 km)

Major junctions
- South end: NM 9 near Windmill
- North end: I-10 near Separ

Location
- Country: United States
- State: New Mexico
- Counties: Hidalgo

Highway system
- New Mexico State Highway System; Interstate; US; State; Scenic
← NM 112	→ NM 114

State Road 113 (NM 113) is a state highway in the US state of New Mexico. Its total length is approximately 20.6 miles (33.2 km). NM 113's southern terminus is at NM 9 east of Windmill, and its northern terminus is at Interstate 10 (I-10) northwest of Separ.

== Major intersections ==
The entire route is in Hidalgo County.

Location	mi	km	Destinations	Notes
	0.000	0.000	NM 9	Southern terminus
	20.602	33.156	I-10	Northern terminus, exit 34 (I-10)
1.000 mi = 1.609 km; 1.000 km = 0.621 mi

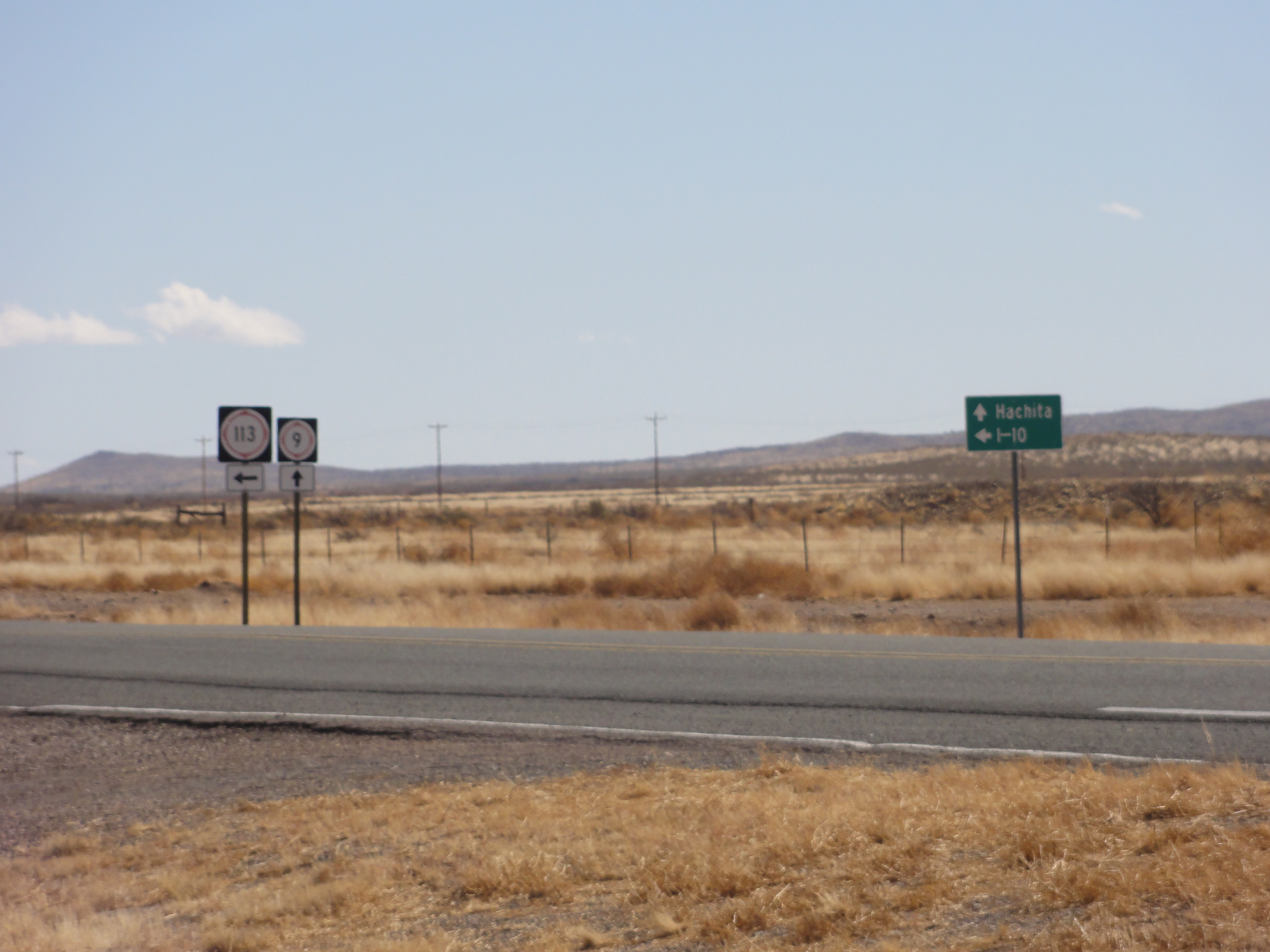

== See also ==
- List of state roads in New Mexico
