= New Mexico State Road 11 =

State highway in New Mexico, United States

State Road 11
- Columbus Road (Ike Smalley Memorial Highway)
- NM 11 highlighted in red

Route information
- Maintained by NMDOT
- Length: 34.119 mi (54.909 km)
- Existed: 1912–present

Major junctions
- South end: Fed. 2 spur at the Mexican border near Columbus
- NM 9 in Columbus
- North end: Florida Street in Deming

Location
- Country: United States
- State: New Mexico
- Counties: Luna

Highway system
- New Mexico State Highway System; Interstate; US; State; Scenic
← NM 10	→ NM 12

State Road 11 (NM 11) is a north–south road that travels from the United States–Mexico border crossing in Columbus to Deming.

== Route description ==
NM 11 begins at Mexican Federal Highway 2 spur (Fed. 2 spur) at the border crossing with Mexico in Columbus. In Columbus NM 11 intersects with NM 9. The road proceeds in a northern direction toward the city of Deming through largely rural landscape. The northern terminus of NM 11 is at Florida Street in Deming where it continues north as Cody Road and then South Gold Avenue to an intersection with I-10 Bus.

== History ==
NM 11 was one of the original numbered routes during the formation of the New Mexico State Highway System in 1912, running from NM 4 in Deming north to NM 43 and NM 12 in Mogollon via Silver City. A portion of present-day NM 11 south of Deming was designated NM 29. By 1918, NM 29 was extended south to Columbus. In 1923, NM 11 between Deming and Cliff was added to the Federal Highway System along with the full length of NM 29. In 1926 the NM 11 designation replaced the entirety of NM 29 between Deming and Columbus. By 1927, NM 11 replaced all of NM 12 south of Reserve and had been further extended northwest to the Arizona state line near Luna. Despite several state roads being removed or truncated during the 1927 Renumbering to make way for the new United States Numbered Highway System, the entirety of NM 11 remained unaffected. The renumbering did create a two new major intersections for NM 11 with US 80 and the original US 180. By 1935, NM 11 had been extended south to the Mexican border. By 1939, the northern terminus of NM 11 had been truncated to US 80 Deming, with the section between Arizona and Deming being replaced by US 260. Today NM 174 and current US 180 follow the old route of NM 11 north of Deming.

The portion of NM 11 from Florida Street in Deming north to I-10 Bus. was transferred to the City of Deming on July 15, 1999 in a road maintenance exchange agreement.

== Major intersections ==
The entire route is in Luna County.

Location	mi	km	Destinations	Notes
Columbus	0.000	0.000	Fed. 2 spur (Cinco de Mayo Road) – Puerto Palomas	Continuation beyond Mexico–United States border
Columbus	3.181	5.119	NM 9 – Hachita, Santa Teresa	
Deming	34.119	54.909	Florida Street	Northern terminus
Deming	34.119	54.909	Cody Road and South Gold Avenue To I-10 BL / US 180 / I-10 / US 70	Continuation beyond Florida Street
1.000 mi = 1.609 km; 1.000 km = 0.621 mi
