= Columbus Municipal Airport (New Mexico) =

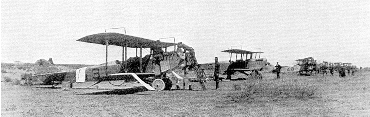
- 1st Aero Squadron on the Mexican US border, 1916, marked with "later Soviet-style red stars", as the US national insignia, on rudder and wings

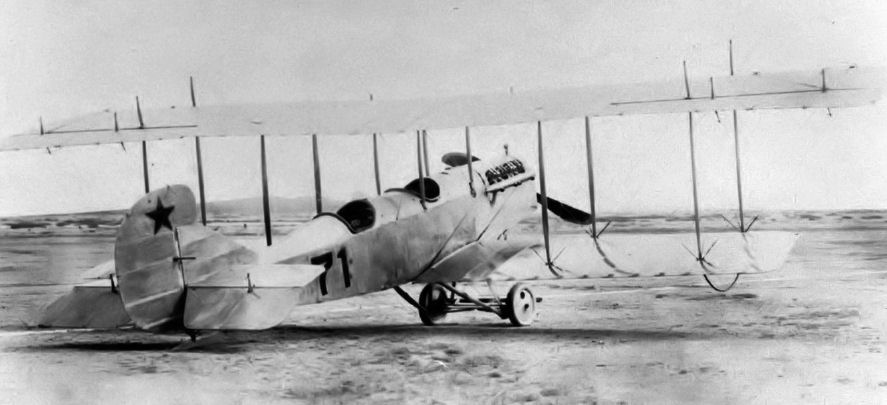
- A 1st Aero Squadron Curtiss R–2, Signal Corps No. 71, at Columbus, New Mexico, 1916
- IATA: CUS; ICAO: none; FAA LID: 0NM0

Summary
- Location: Columbus, New Mexico
- Built: 1916
- In use: 1916-1980s
- Elevation AMSL: 4,024 ft (1,227 m)
- Coordinates: 31°49′30″N 107°37′56″W (Historical); 31°48′29″N 107°39′42″W (Private airstrip)

Map
- Location of Columbus Municipal Airport

Runways
Direction	Length		Surface
Direction	ft	m	Surface
08/26	4,210	1,283	dirt and sagebrush

Columbus Municipal Airport (IATA: CUS, FAA LID: 0NM0) is an abandoned airport in New Mexico. Its origins date to 1916 when it was used by the Aviation Section, U.S. Signal Corps as a military airfield during the Pancho Villa Expedition. It was apparently closed and abandoned in the late 1970s. Today, efforts are being made to restore it to a general aviation airport.

Columbus Municipal Airport is historically recognized as the birthplace of American air power.

== History ==
=== 1st Aero Squadron ===
During the Mexican Revolution, hundreds of Pancho Villa's horsemen crossed the United States border and raided Columbus, New Mexico on 9 March 1916. The town was looted and burned, and 17 Americans were killed.

President Woodrow Wilson immediately asked President Carranza of Mexico for permission to send United States troops into his country, and Carranza reluctantly gave permission "for the sole purpose of capturing the bandit Villa." Wilson then ordered General John J. Pershing to "pursue and disperse," the forces commanded by Villa. One of Pershing's first acts was to order the 1st Aero Squadron to Columbus to establish a base of operations. The squadron left Fort Sam Houston in San Antonio, Texas on 13 March. Two days later it arrived in Columbus with eight Curtiss JN-3 aircraft, 11 pilots and 82 enlisted men and established an airfield to the southeast of the town.

The Curtiss aircraft were not in good condition. However, despite their lack of readiness, the fliers prepared for combat. The first reconnaissance flight into Mexico was made on 16 March, Captain Dodd piloting Airplane #44, with Captain Foulois as observer.

Pershing crossed the border with 6,600 men a week after the Columbus raid. As the soldiers pushed south, hoping to encircle Villa's forces, the 1st Aero Squadron was ordered to Casas Grandes, Mexico, 90 miles from the U.S. border. All of the eight airplanes of the Squadron were started in flight from Columbus at 5:10 P. M., on March 19. Due to motor trouble, one of the airplanes was compelled to return to Columbus.

Using its base in Columbus, the 1st Aero Squadron concentrated on carrying mail and dispatches between Columbus and Pershing's Army columns moving south into Mexico. During the last few days of March, the squadron's planes flew approximately 20 missions with messages for the various columns of Pershing's command. After the loss of most squadron aircraft in Mexico due to non-combat causes, the remaining two JN-3s and the rest of the squadron were ordered back to Columbus for refitting.

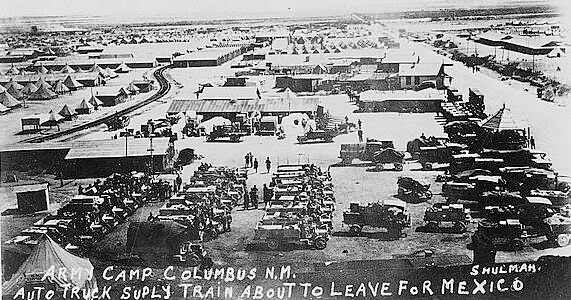
Camp Columbus, New Mexico

The fliers arrived on 20 April 1916, and found four new Curtiss N-8s, an export version of the JN-4, the latest model of the Jenny. These were the first of 94 JN-4s ordered by the Army in 1916. The aviators tested their new planes during the last week of April and found them lacking. The airmen complained so bitterly about their new planes that the N-8s were quickly withdrawn from the border and sent to Rockwell Field, San Diego, California, where they were used for training and experimentation. The Technical Aero Advisory and Inspection Board of the Signal Corps decided instead to equip the 1st Aero with the Curtiss R-2, which boasted a 160-hp engine.

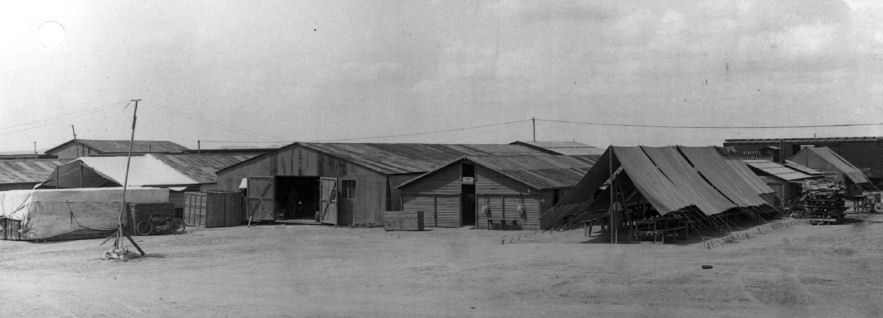
The 1st Aero Squadron's facilities at Columbus, New Mexico, 1916

Twelve R-2s were delivered to the squadron in May, but the planes, which had been very hastily constructed, were missing vital spare parts and had faulty wiring and leaky fuel tanks. The aircraft even lacked compasses, instruments and tool kits when they arrived. The experienced mechanics at Columbus soon put the planes into flying shape, however. The R-2s used in Mexico were eventually equipped with automatic cameras, radios and Lewis machine guns, as well as incendiary and explosive bombs (the weapons were never used in Mexico).

Despite the use of airplanes, the U.S. Army never managed to locate the elusive Pancho Villa. Although the 1st Aero Squadron remained at Columbus until August 1917 when it was ordered to France after the United States' entry into World War I.

=== Civil use ===
After World War I, Columbus Airfield was used by the Army as part of their patrol flights along the Mexican border. When the Border Patrol operation ended in June 1921, all airfields except Biggs Field in El Paso were closed and most units were reassigned to other stations.

The next use of the airfield was when the Department of Commerce refitted the facility as one of its network of Intermediate Landing Fields, which were established in the 1920s & 1930s to serve as emergency landing fields along commercial airways between major cities. It was designated as "Site 65" along the San Diego - El Paso Airway. It was said to have two dirt runways: 3,610; east/west & 2,628' north/south. The field was said to have a rotating beacon, but to offer no services. During the War and afterward, it served as an emergency landing field for military aircraft traveling between airfields in Texas and airfields in Arizona and California. For example, in 1948 a B-29 with one engine out landed at the base. A C-47 with a new engine and crew of mechanics from Biggs Field made repairs and several days later, the B-29 continued to Davis-Monthan Field in Tucson, Arizona.

After World War II, the airport was expanded to an all-way landing area measuring 3,610' east/west & 2,610' north/south. It apparently had a rotating beacon, course, obstacle, boundary, landing strip, and range lights. The airfield was described as being owned by private interests, and operated by the Civil Aeronautics Administration.

A building at the airport was used as a terminal, with a communication & weather station. It had two electric generators, as the city of Columbus was not serviced for electricity before 1948. It was later deeded to the city of Columbus for operation, and a 4'000 gravel surface runway was laid down.

The airport's operations ceased abruptly with the arrest of the notorious "Columbus Air Force" drug-running gang by the DEA in the late 1970s. FAA records indicate it was open until 1994, but its badly deteriorated condition indicates it was abandoned much earlier.

Today, efforts are being made to restore part of the airport and re-establish it as an active facility for general aviation. Another airfield, which appears to be a private landing strip, is located about 2 miles southwest of the historical airport.
