= Playas, New Mexico =

Census-designated place in Hidalgo, New Mexico, United States

- Census-designated place
- Playas town center, February 24, 2005

- Location within New Mexico Location within the United States
- Coordinates: 31°54′45″N 108°32′11″W
- Country: United States
- State: New Mexico
- County: Hidalgo

Area
  - Total: 1.86 sq mi (4.83 km^{2})
  - Land: 1.86 sq mi (4.83 km^{2})
  - Water: 0 sq mi (0.00 km^{2})
- Elevation: 4,482 ft (1,366 m)

Population (2020)
  - Total: 25
  - Density: 13.4/sq mi (5.18/km^{2})
- Time zone: UTC-7 (Mountain (MST))
  - Summer (DST): UTC-6 (MDT)
- ZIP Code: 88009
- Area code: 575
- FIPS code: 35-58210
- GNIS feature ID: 2584181

Playas is a census-designated place (CDP) in Hidalgo County, New Mexico, United States. As of the 2020 census, Playas had a population of 25.

== History ==
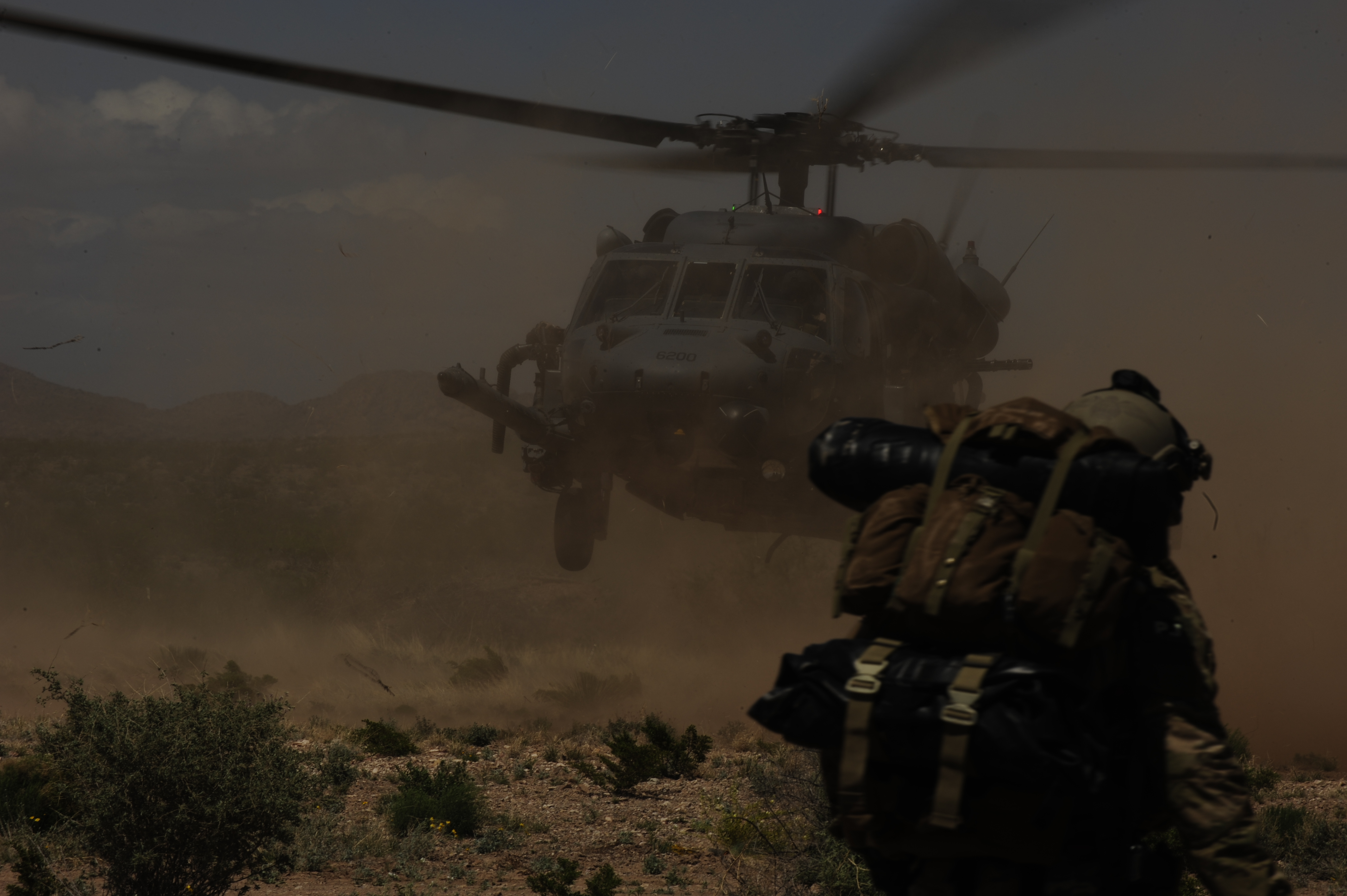
A training exercise at the Playas Training and Research Center in April 2010

It is a former company town, named after a nearby former settlement along the Southern Pacific Railroad. It was developed by the Phelps Dodge Corporation in the 1970s for employees of its then-new Hidalgo Copper Smelter, located 10 miles (16 km) south of the development. Over 270 rental homes, six apartment buildings, a post office, grocery/dry goods store (Phelps Dodge Mercantile), medical clinic with heliport, a bowling alley ("Copper Pins"), grill, a rodeo arena, horse stables, a fitness center, a shooting range, an airstrip and a swimming pool were built for the community, which even has its own ZIP Code (88009). At its peak, the town had about 1,100 residents and included two churches built on land leased from the mining company.

The smelter, which included state of the art environmental controls, a power plant and sulfuric acid plants, was closed by the company as part of a move towards new processing technologies for processing copper concentrates. Declining copper prices accelerated the closure in 1999; all of its residents were required to leave within a year, though a skeleton crew of about a dozen employees remained in the area. Before completion of razing the plant and reclamation of the site, the smelter, about 30 miles (48 km) north of the border with Mexico, was nicknamed La Estrella del Norte by illegal migrants using its lights as a beacon for crossing into the country.

Four years later, New Mexico Tech agreed to purchase the town and the surrounding 1,200 acres (490 ha) for $5 million, using Department of Homeland Security funds secured by Senator Pete Domenici. The town is now a training and research facility (the Playas Training and Research Center, operated by New Mexico Tech's EMRTC) for the university's first responders, counter-terrorism, and Air Force programs, supported by tens of millions of dollars in federal funds.

== Geography ==
Playas is located in eastern Hidalgo County and is bordered to the east by Grant County. It is at the south terminus of New Mexico State Road 113 5 miles (8 km) south of New Mexico State Road 9, 15 miles (24 km) east-southeast of Animas, 15 miles (24 km) west of Hachita and 32 miles (51 km) south of Lordsburg, the Hidalgo County seat. It sits at the northwestern base of the Little Hatchet Mountains, on the east side of the Playas Valley.

According to the U.S. Census Bureau, the Playas CDP has an area of 1.9 square miles (4.8 km^{2}), all land.

== Demographics ==
Historical population
Census	Pop.	Note	%±
2010	74		—
2020	25		−66.2%
U.S. Decennial Census

== See also ==
- List of census-designated places in New Mexico
