= Glen Acres, New Mexico =

- Census-designated place
- Location within New Mexico Location within the United States
- Coordinates: 32°22′23″N 108°42′58″W
- Country: United States
- State: New Mexico
- County: Hidalgo

Area
  - Total: 0.99 sq mi (2.56 km^{2})
  - Land: 0.99 sq mi (2.56 km^{2})
  - Water: 0 sq mi (0.00 km^{2})
- Elevation: 4,196 ft (1,279 m)

Population (2020)
  - Total: 204
  - Density: 206.6/sq mi (79.75/km^{2})
- Time zone: UTC-7 (Mountain (MST))
  - Summer (DST): UTC-6 (MDT)
- Area code: 575
- GNIS feature ID: 2584103

Glen Acres is a census-designated place in Hidalgo County, New Mexico, United States. As of the 2020 census, Glen Acres had a population of 204. The community is located along U.S. Route 70. The community's streets are named after golfers (e.g. Sam Sneed (sic) Drive, Lee Trevino Drive, Tom Shaw Road).

== Geography ==
According to the U.S. Census Bureau, the community has an area of 0.955 square miles (2.47 km^{2}), all land.

== Demographics ==
Historical population
Census	Pop.	Note	%±
2020	204		—
U.S. Decennial Census
