= Antelope Wells, New Mexico =

- Unincorporated settlement
- Location within New Mexico Location within the United States
- Coordinates: 31°20′56″N 108°30′32″W
- Country: United States
- U.S. state: New Mexico
- County: Hidalgo
- Elevation: 4,666 ft (1,422 m)

Population (1981)
  - Total: 2
- Time zone: UTC-7 (Mountain Standard Time (MST))
  - Summer (DST): UTC-6 (Mountain Daylight Time (MDT))
- Area code: 575
- GNIS feature ID: 898517

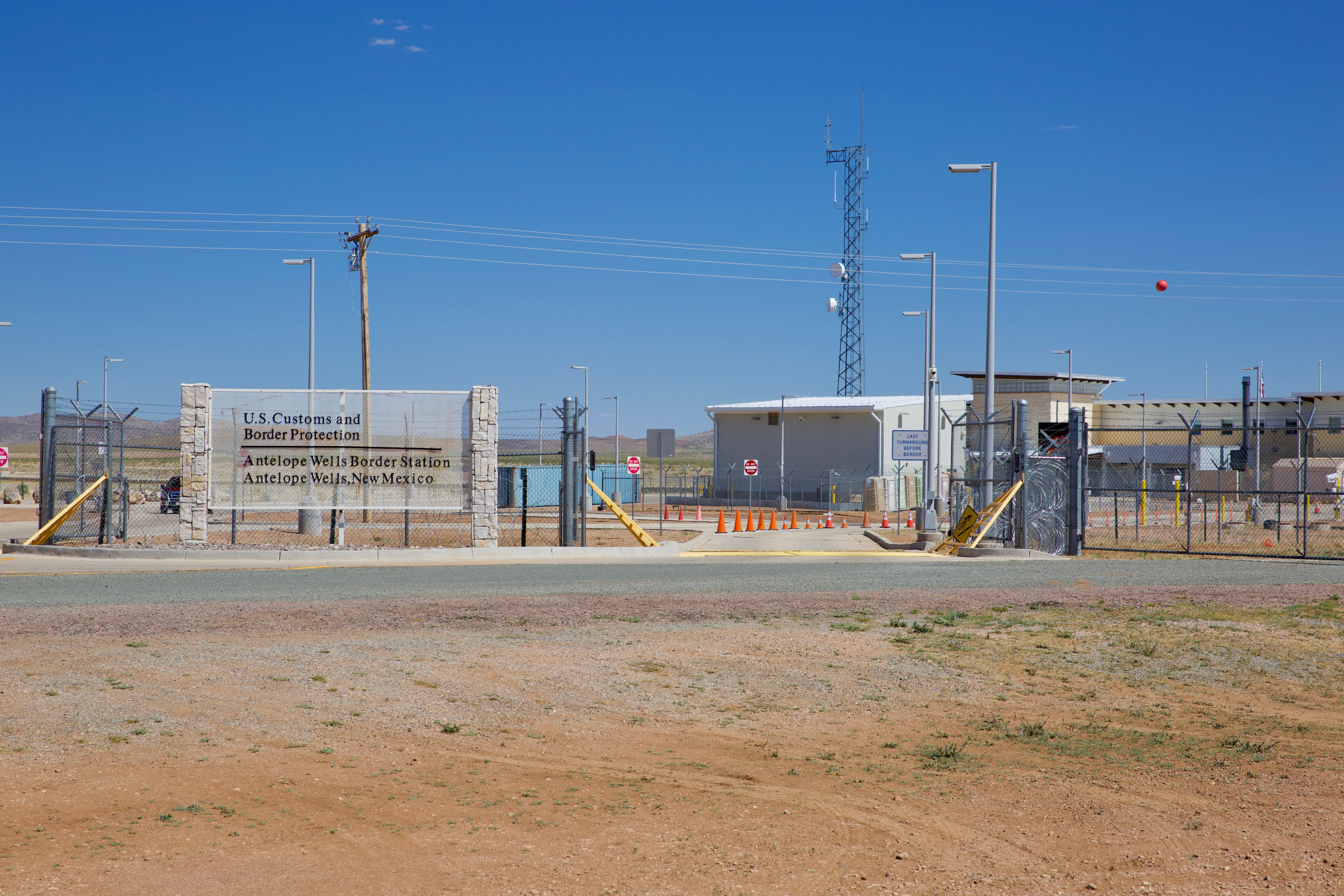
Antelope Wells Border Station in 2019

Antelope Wells is a small unincorporated community in Hidalgo County, New Mexico, United States. The community is located along the Mexico-United States border, in the New Mexico Bootheel region, located across the border from the small settlement of El Berrendo, Chihuahua, Mexico.

== Etymology ==
Today there are neither pronghorn (known regionally as antelopes) nor water wells in the area, but a local intermittent pond may have supported a population previously. The name comes from an old ranch, located 2.5 miles (4.0 km) north of the current community. The only inhabitants of the community are U.S. Customs and Border Protection employees.

== Geography ==
Antelope Wells is the southernmost settlement of New Mexico, situated in the region commonly known as the Bootheel of New Mexico. It is the smallest and least-used border crossing of the 43 ports of entry along the border with Mexico. The crossing, which is open solely for non-commercial traffic, is open every day from 10:00 AM to 4:00 PM.

== History ==
The port was established by Ulysses S. Grant in 1872 and has been staffed since 1928. In 1981, the community had a population of two, living in trailers behind the customs station, and averaged three people entering per day. In 2005, 93 pedestrians crossed over the border in the community, which consisted of just four buildings: the port of entry building, two houses and a trailer. Including domestic and international travelers, fewer than 500 buses and privately owned vehicles pass through the community each month, though traffic has been increasing as of 2006 with more international shuttle van service. Despite its low usage, there is no move to close the port, which is the only port between Douglas, Arizona, and Columbus, New Mexico, and provides the most direct route from the United States to the Sierra Madre Occidental.

== Recreation ==
Antelope Wells is located on New Mexico State Road 81, which links it with Interstate 10 and New Mexico State Road 9. Antelope Wells was the official southern terminus of the 3,100-mile (5,000 km) long Continental Divide Trail until it was relocated to Crazy Cook, east of the nearby Hatchet Mountains in the mid-1990s and remains the location of the 2,745-mile (4,418 km) long Great Divide Mountain Bike Route.

== Climate ==
According to the Köppen Climate Classification system, Antelope Wells has a cold semi-arid climate, abbreviated "BSk" on climate maps. The hottest temperature recorded in Antelope Wells was 109 °F (42.8 °C) on June 27, 1994, while the coldest temperature recorded was −6 °F (−21.1 °C) on February 3, 2011.

Climate data for Antelope Wells, New Mexico (1991–2020 normals, extremes 1990–present)
Month	Jan	Feb	Mar	Apr	May	Jun	Jul	Aug	Sep	Oct	Nov	Dec	Year
Record high °F (°C)	81 (27)	86 (30)	95 (35)	96 (36)	102 (39)	109 (43)	107 (42)	105 (41)	101 (38)	96 (36)	90 (32)	82 (28)	109 (43)
Mean maximum °F (°C)	72.8 (22.7)	76.6 (24.8)	82.9 (28.3)	88.6 (31.4)	95.6 (35.3)	102.6 (39.2)	101.8 (38.8)	97.8 (36.6)	95.4 (35.2)	90.6 (32.6)	81.9 (27.7)	73.9 (23.3)	104.0 (40.0)
Mean daily maximum °F (°C)	58.3 (14.6)	63.4 (17.4)	69.8 (21.0)	76.6 (24.8)	85.1 (29.5)	93.1 (33.9)	91.1 (32.8)	88.8 (31.6)	85.5 (29.7)	78.3 (25.7)	67.3 (19.6)	58.2 (14.6)	76.3 (24.6)
Daily mean °F (°C)	42.5 (5.8)	46.6 (8.1)	52.3 (11.3)	58.8 (14.9)	67.3 (19.6)	76.7 (24.8)	78.1 (25.6)	75.6 (24.2)	70.8 (21.6)	61.2 (16.2)	50.5 (10.3)	42.3 (5.7)	60.2 (15.7)
Mean daily minimum °F (°C)	26.6 (−3.0)	29.8 (−1.2)	34.8 (1.6)	41.0 (5.0)	49.6 (9.8)	60.3 (15.7)	65.1 (18.4)	62.4 (16.9)	56.0 (13.3)	44.2 (6.8)	33.7 (0.9)	26.4 (−3.1)	44.2 (6.8)
Mean minimum °F (°C)	13.8 (−10.1)	17.0 (−8.3)	21.6 (−5.8)	27.5 (−2.5)	37.9 (3.3)	47.9 (8.8)	58.5 (14.7)	55.4 (13.0)	45.9 (7.7)	30.0 (−1.1)	19.2 (−7.1)	14.6 (−9.7)	10.0 (−12.2)
Record low °F (°C)	4 (−16)	−6 (−21)	3 (−16)	21 (−6)	29 (−2)	30 (−1)	47 (8)	47 (8)	36 (2)	17 (−8)	7 (−14)	7 (−14)	−6 (−21)
Average precipitation inches (mm)	0.85 (22)	0.43 (11)	0.37 (9.4)	0.15 (3.8)	0.24 (6.1)	0.71 (18)	3.14 (80)	2.29 (58)	1.65 (42)	0.73 (19)	0.81 (21)	1.06 (27)	12.43 (317.3)
Average snowfall inches (cm)	0.3 (0.76)	0.0 (0.0)	0.0 (0.0)	0.0 (0.0)	0.0 (0.0)	0.0 (0.0)	0.0 (0.0)	0.0 (0.0)	0.0 (0.0)	0.0 (0.0)	0.1 (0.25)	0.8 (2.0)	1.2 (3.01)
Average precipitation days (≥ 0.01 in)	3.9	3.6	3.1	1.3	1.4	2.9	11.4	10.7	6.9	4.9	3.2	5.0	58.3
Average snowy days (≥ 0.1 in)	0.1	0.0	0.0	0.0	0.0	0.0	0.0	0.0	0.0	0.0	0.0	0.3	0.4
Source: NOAA

== See also ==
- Antelope Wells Port of Entry
- List of Mexico–United States border crossings
