= New Mexico State Road 338 =

Highway in New Mexico

State Road 338
- NM 338 highlighted in red

Route information
- Maintained by NMDOT
- Length: 24.440 mi (39.332 km)

Major junctions
- South end: Route C001 in Animas
- NM 9 in Animas
- North end: I-10 northeast of Road Forks

Location
- Country: United States
- State: New Mexico
- Counties: Hidalgo

Highway system
- New Mexico State Highway System; Interstate; US; State; Scenic
← NM 337	→ NM 339

State Road 338 (NM 338) is a 24.440-mile-long (39.332 km) state highway in the US state of New Mexico. NM 338's southern terminus is in Animas where it continues south as Route C001 and the northern terminus is northeast of Road Forks at Interstate 10 (I-10). NM 338 and NM 9 are the only two remaining state highways to form a concurrency after the 1988 renumbering.

== History ==
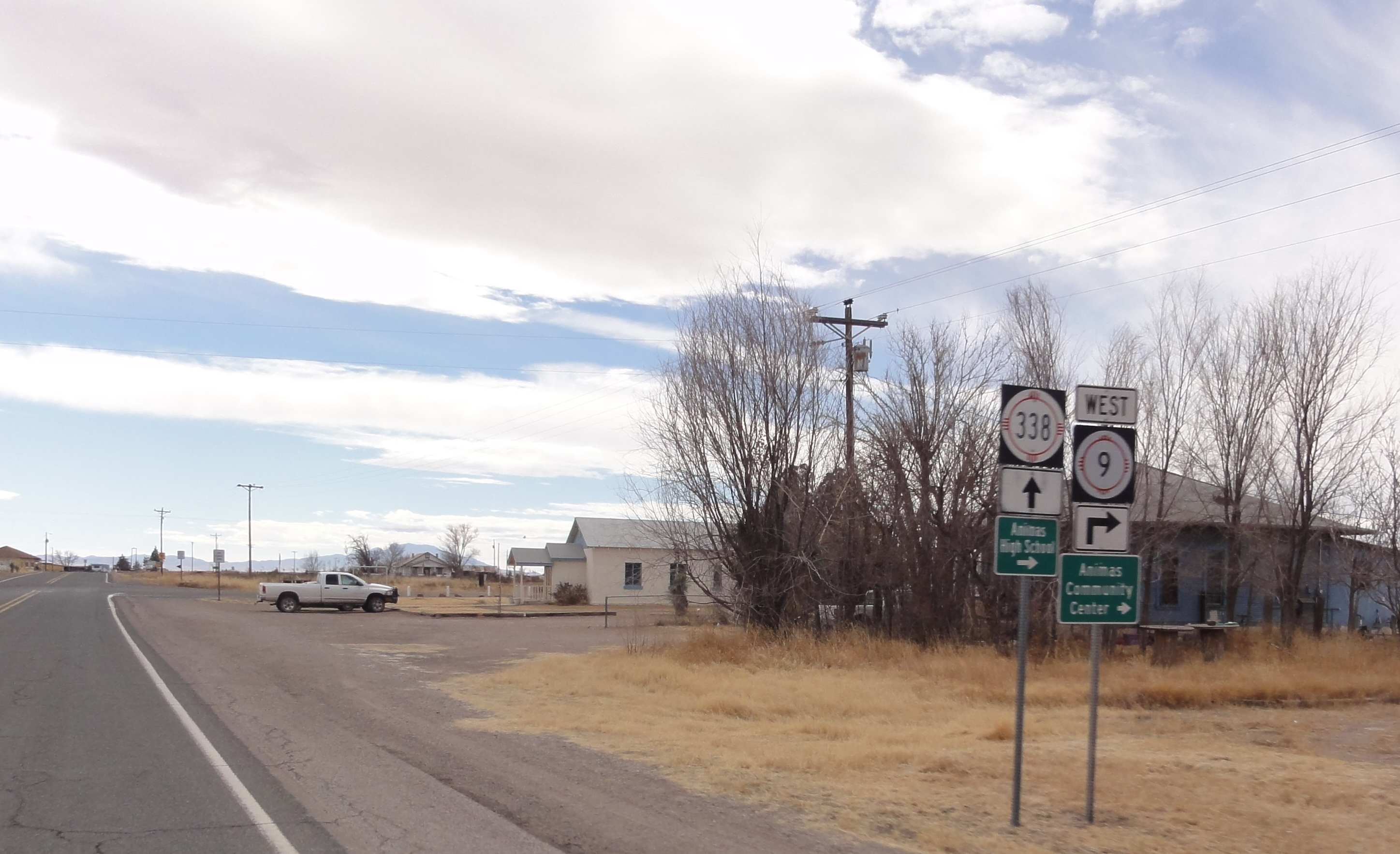
NM 338 approaching the southern end of its overlap with NM 9

The portion of NM 338 from its southern terminus southward was transferred to Hidalgo County on May 9, 1989, in a road exchange agreement.

== Major intersections ==
The entire route is in Hidalgo County.

Location	mi	km	Destinations	Notes
	0.000	0.000	I-10	Northern terminus
	10.866	17.487	NM 145 west	Eastern end of NM 145
Animas	24.161	38.883	NM 9 east	Northern end of NM 9 concurrency
Animas	24.288	39.088	NM 9 west	Southern end of NM 9 concurrency
Animas	24.440	39.332	C001	Southern terminus, continues south as Route C001
1.000 mi = 1.609 km; 1.000 km = 0.621 mi: Concurrency terminus
