= Hidalgo County, New Mexico =

County in New Mexico, United States

- County
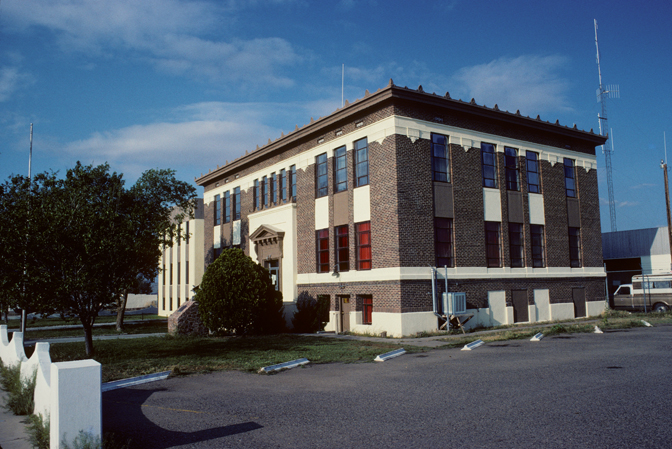
- Hidalgo County courthouse in Lordsburg

- Location within the U.S. state of New Mexico
- Coordinates: 31°55′N 108°43′W
- Country: United States
- State: New Mexico
- Founded: January 1, 1920
- Named for: Villa de Guadalupe Hidalgo
- Seat: Lordsburg
- Largest city: Lordsburg

Area
  - Total: 3,446 sq mi (8,930 km^{2})
  - Land: 3,437 sq mi (8,900 km^{2})
  - Water: 9.1 sq mi (24 km^{2}) 0.3%

Population (2020)
  - Total: 4,178
  - Estimate (2025): 3,929 ▼
  - Density: 1.216/sq mi (0.4693/km^{2})
- Time zone: UTC−7 (Mountain)
  - Summer (DST): UTC−6 (MDT)
- Congressional district: 2nd
- Website: www.hidalgocounty.org

Hidalgo County (Spanish: Condado de Hidalgo) is the southernmost county of the U.S. state of New Mexico. As of the 2020 census, the population was 4,178. The county seat and largest city is Lordsburg. A bill creating Hidalgo from the southern part of Grant County was passed on February 25, 1919, taking effect at the beginning of 1920. The county was named for the town north of Mexico City where the Treaty of Guadalupe Hidalgo was signed, which in turn was named for Miguel Hidalgo y Costilla, the priest who is known as the "Father of Mexican Independence."

The county is located on the Mexico–United States border, comprises the New Mexico Bootheel, and is majority-Hispanic or Latino.

== Geography ==
According to the U.S. Census Bureau, the county has a total area of 3,446 square miles (8,930 km^{2}), of which 3,437 square miles (8,900 km^{2}) is land and 9.1 square miles (24 km^{2}) (0.3%) is water. The southern part of the county, the part bounded on the east and south by Mexico, is known as the Bootheel.

=== Adjacent counties and municipios ===
- Grant County – north
- Luna County – east
- Cochise County, Arizona – west
- Greenlee County, Arizona – northwest
- Agua Prieta, Sonora, Mexico – south
- Ascensión, Chihuahua, Mexico – southeast
- Janos, Chihuahua, Mexico – south

=== National protected areas ===
- Coronado National Forest (part)
- Gila National Forest (part)

== Demographics ==
Historical population
Census	Pop.	Note	%±
1920	4,338		—
1930	5,023		15.8%
1940	4,821		−4.0%
1950	5,095		5.7%
1960	4,961		−2.6%
1970	4,734		−4.6%
1980	6,049		27.8%
1990	5,958		−1.5%
2000	5,932		−0.4%
2010	4,894		−17.5%
2020	4,178		−14.6%
2025 (est.)	3,929	▼	−6.0%
U.S. Decennial Census; 1790-1960 1900-1990; 1990-2000 2010

=== 2020 census ===
As of the 2020 census, the county had a population of 4,178. The median age was 43.5 years. 22.5% of residents were under the age of 18 and 21.7% of residents were 65 years of age or older. For every 100 females there were 101.6 males, and for every 100 females age 18 and over there were 104.2 males.

Hidalgo County, New Mexico – Racial and ethnic composition Note: the US Census treats Hispanic/Latino as an ethnic category. This table excludes Latinos from the racial categories and assigns them to a separate category. Hispanics/Latinos may be of any race.
Race / Ethnicity (NH = Non-Hispanic)	Pop 2000	Pop 2010	Pop 2020	% 2000	% 2010	% 2020
White alone (NH)	2,532	2,025	1,645	42.68%	41.38%	39.37%
Black or African American alone (NH)	15	17	14	0.25%	0.35%	0.34%
Native American or Alaska Native alone (NH)	13	16	14	0.22%	0.33%	0.34%
Asian alone (NH)	13	23	11	0.22%	0.47%	0.26%
Pacific Islander alone (NH)	0	2	5	0.00%	0.04%	0.12%
Other race alone (NH)	0	5	28	0.00%	0.10%	0.67%
Mixed race or Multiracial (NH)	35	37	71	0.59%	0.76%	1.70%
Hispanic or Latino (any race)	3,324	2,769	2,390	56.04%	56.58%	57.20%
Total	5,932	4,894	4,178	100.00%	100.00%	100.00%

The racial makeup of the county was 63.5% White, 0.3% Black or African American, 1.0% American Indian and Alaska Native, 0.3% Asian, 0.2% Native Hawaiian and Pacific Islander, 11.4% from some other race, and 23.3% from two or more races. Hispanic or Latino residents of any race comprised 57.2% of the population.

0.0% of residents lived in urban areas, while 100.0% lived in rural areas.

There were 1,714 households in the county, of which 30.0% had children under the age of 18 living with them and 28.2% had a female householder with no spouse or partner present. About 32.3% of all households were made up of individuals and 14.2% had someone living alone who was 65 years of age or older.

There were 2,190 housing units, of which 21.7% were vacant. Among occupied housing units, 71.1% were owner-occupied and 28.9% were renter-occupied. The homeowner vacancy rate was 1.9% and the rental vacancy rate was 18.7%.

=== 2010 census ===
As of the 2010 census, there were 4,894 people, 1,936 households, and 1,286 families residing in the county. The population density was 1.4 inhabitants per square mile (0.54/km^{2}). There were 2,393 housing units at an average density of 0.7 per square mile (0.27/km^{2}). The racial makeup of the county was 85.3% white, 0.8% American Indian, 0.6% black or African American, 0.5% Asian, 11.0% from other races, and 1.8% from two or more races. Those of Hispanic or Latino origin made up 56.6% of the population. The largest ancestry groups were:

- 50.3% Mexican
- 15.2% German
- 10.0% English
- 6.0% Irish
- 4.4% Dutch
- 3.6% American
- 2.1% Scottish
- 2.0% Italian
- 1.7% Swedish
- 1.4% Norwegian
- 1.0% Polish

Of the 1,936 households, 33.4% had children under the age of 18 living with them, 46.4% were married couples living together, 14.2% had a female householder with no husband present, 33.6% were non-families, and 29.1% of all households were made up of individuals. The average household size was 2.49 and the average family size was 3.09. The median age was 40.9 years.

The median income for a household in the county was $36,733 and the median income for a family was $41,594. Males had a median income of $43,531 versus $23,482 for females. The per capita income for the county was $17,451. About 20.6% of families and 22.6% of the population were below the poverty line, including 32.3% of those under age 18 and 15.0% of those age 65 or over.

=== 2000 census ===
As of the 2000 census, there were 5,932 people in the county, organized into 2,152 households, and 1,542 families. The population density was 1 person per square mile (0.39 person/km^{2}). There were 2,848 housing units at an average density of 1 units per square mile (0.39/km^{2}). The racial makeup of the county was 42% White and about 55% of the population was Hispanic.

Size of family households: 592 2-persons, 341 3-persons, 316 4-persons, 165 5-persons, 83 6-persons, 48 7-or-more-persons. The average household size was 2.7 and the average family size was 3.29. In non-family households, there were 684 with 314 male householders (286 living alone), 293 female householders (262 living alone), and 77 non-relatives. In group quarters, there were 85 (all institutionalized).

In the county, the population was spread out, with 31.70% under the age of 18, 7.80% from 18 to 24, 25.20% from 25 to 44, 21.70% from 45 to 64, and 13.60% who were 65 years of age or older. The median age was 35 years. For every 100 females there were 99.60 males. For every 100 females age 18 and over, there were 97.00 males.

The median income for a household in the county was $31,286. The per capita income for the county was $12,431. 27.8% of the population was below the poverty line. Out of the total population, 38.90% of those under the age of 18 and 17.00% of those 65 and older were living below the poverty line. Unemployment rate in April 2010 was 7.6%.

== Communities ==
=== City ===
- Lordsburg (county seat)

=== Village ===
- Virden

=== Census-designated places ===
- Animas
- Cotton City
- Glen Acres
- Playas
- Rodeo
- Windmill

=== Unincorporated communities ===
- Antelope Wells
- Garcia
- Mouser Place
- Road Forks
- Summit

=== Ghost towns ===
- Bramlett
- Cloverdale
- Gary
- Road Fork
- Steins
- Shakespeare
- Valedon

== Politics ==
Hidalgo has historically been a swing county, going for the winner every time since 1928, except for 1968 and 2020, where it went for Hubert Humphrey and Donald Trump respectively. In 2024, Trump broke 60% of the county's vote, the first time that a Republican presidential candidate had done this since Nixon's 1972 landslide. While the city of Lordsburg tends to lean Democratic, the rest of the county, especially the southern half, is heavily Republican.

United States presidential election results for Hidalgo County, New Mexico
Year	Republican		Democratic		Third party(ies)	
Year	No.	%	No.	%	No.	%
1920	443	44.39%	551	55.21%	4	0.40%
1924	261	28.19%	476	51.40%	189	20.41%
1928	561	52.38%	509	47.53%	1	0.09%
1932	299	20.48%	1,131	77.47%	30	2.05%
1936	326	22.34%	1,115	76.42%	18	1.23%
1940	516	32.97%	1,049	67.03%	0	0.00%
1944	367	31.26%	807	68.74%	0	0.00%
1948	374	30.11%	859	69.16%	9	0.72%
1952	781	50.58%	757	49.03%	6	0.39%
1956	790	50.51%	771	49.30%	3	0.19%
1960	750	45.65%	889	54.11%	4	0.24%
1964	628	38.43%	995	60.89%	11	0.67%
1968	606	39.25%	678	43.91%	260	16.84%
1972	1,051	63.43%	562	33.92%	44	2.66%
1976	891	48.56%	938	51.12%	6	0.33%
1980	1,059	53.19%	840	42.19%	92	4.62%
1984	1,282	59.32%	860	39.80%	19	0.88%
1988	1,100	54.46%	901	44.60%	19	0.94%
1992	871	37.62%	995	42.98%	449	19.40%
1996	789	40.42%	943	48.31%	220	11.27%
2000	954	52.02%	839	45.75%	41	2.24%
2004	1,081	55.04%	861	43.84%	22	1.12%
2008	936	47.98%	993	50.90%	22	1.13%
2012	899	46.46%	995	51.42%	41	2.12%
2016	910	48.61%	784	41.88%	178	9.51%
2020	1,120	56.74%	823	41.69%	31	1.57%
2024	1,140	61.22%	705	37.86%	17	0.91%

== Transportation ==
- I-10
  - I-10 BL (Lordsburg)
- US 70
- NM 9
- NM 80
- NM 81
- NM 90
- NM 92
- NM 113
- NM 145
- NM 338
- NM 464
- NM 494
- NM 533

== See also ==
- National Register of Historic Places listings in Hidalgo County, New Mexico
- Janos Biosphere Reserve
