= New Mexico State Road 81 =

State highway in New Mexico, United States

State Road 81
- NM 81 highlighted in red

Route information
- Maintained by NMDOT
- Length: 45.800 mi (73.708 km)

Major junctions
- South end: To Fed. 2 at the Mexican border in Antelope Wells
- North end: NM 9 in Hachita

Location
- Country: United States
- State: New Mexico
- Counties: Hidalgo, Grant

Highway system
- New Mexico State Highway System; Interstate; US; State; Scenic
← NM 80	→ US 82

New Mexico State Road 81 (NM 81) is a 45.8-mile-long (73.7 km) state road in southwestern New Mexico. The route runs from the Mexico–U.S. border in Antelope Wells north to NM 9 in Hachita, passing through desert and semi-arid farmland. NM 81 is maintained by the New Mexico Department of Transportation (NMDOT).

== Route description ==
NM 81 begins at the Mexico – U.S. border crossing in Antelope Wells, Hidalgo County; a local road links the crossing with Mexico Federal Highway 2 to the south. The border crossing in Antelope Wells is the least-trafficked crossing between Mexico and the U.S., and the only residents of Antelope Wells are U.S. Customs and Border Protection employees. North of Antelope Wells, the road passes through desert terrain, with a mountain range to the west. The road does not pass any communities or service stations between Antelope Wells and Hachita, and it has been described as "quiet" and "isolated"; according to NMDOT, 129 vehicles travel the road per day. Continuing north, the road enters a semi-arid farming region and passes another mountain range in the east. The road makes a turn to the north-northeast and crosses into Grant County before terminating at NM 9 in Hachita.

== Major intersections ==
County	Location	mi	km	Destinations	Notes
Hidalgo	Antelope Wells	0.000	0.000	Local road To Fed. 2	Southern terminus; Mexico–U.S. border crossing
Grant	Hachita	45.800	73.708	NM 9	Northern terminus
1.000 mi = 1.609 km; 1.000 km = 0.621 mi

== See also ==
- List of state roads in New Mexico
