= Columbus Air Force =

Nickname for a group of pilots

- Founder: Willard Houltin
- Founding location: Columbus, New Mexico
- Years active: early 1960s - October 1973
- Territory: Southeastern United States
- Ethnicity: White Southerners
- Activities: drug trafficking, customs avoidance

The Columbus Air Force was the nickname for a group of pilots involved in smuggling marijuana to the U.S. in the 1960s and early 1970s. The group was based out of Columbus, New Mexico, a village next to the Mexican border. The group were reportedly the first pilots to transport drugs across the border by small aircraft. They were headed by Martin Willard Houltin, who served as a World War II B-29 bomber pilot in the United States Army Air Corps. The other members of the Columbus Air Force were Robert Burke, Tim Morrison, Michael Francis, Kenneth Croucher, and Curly Phillips.

== Investigation and arrest ==
A joint state/federal task force, named Operation Sky Night, and headed by the Drug Enforcement Administration was responsible for capturing the members of the Columbus Air Force in October 1973. They were represented in court by criminal defense attorney Lee Chagra, the brother of Jamiel Chagra, who was another major drug trafficker. Because of some legal problems with the wire-taps used to ensnare them, the group ended up pleading to only minor charges and received probation. However, in 1974, six members of the group were indicted and convicted on federal conspiracy charges arising out of the same case, and were sentenced to two consecutive five-year terms. Houltin was arrested twice more in his life, once serving a 16-month sentence in 1980 and then in 1993 having the charges dropped because he was suffering Alzheimer's disease. He died in 1999.

== Notoriety and cultural references ==
The Columbus Air Force received a lot of notoriety after their arrest, and were featured in the New York Times Magazine, Argosy, and even Popular Mechanics. High Times magazine published a 1978 interview of Houltin that called him the "Flying Ace of the Dope Air Force."

The song "Treetop Flyer," written by Stephen Stills and performed by Jimmy Buffett on his album Banana Wind (as a hidden track), is reportedly about the Columbus Air Force. The airstrip in Columbus where the Columbus Air Force flew out of was later the site of a RADAR-equipped aerostat balloon flown by the United States Customs Service, which was used to detect drug traffic.
