= Animas, New Mexico =

- Census-designated place
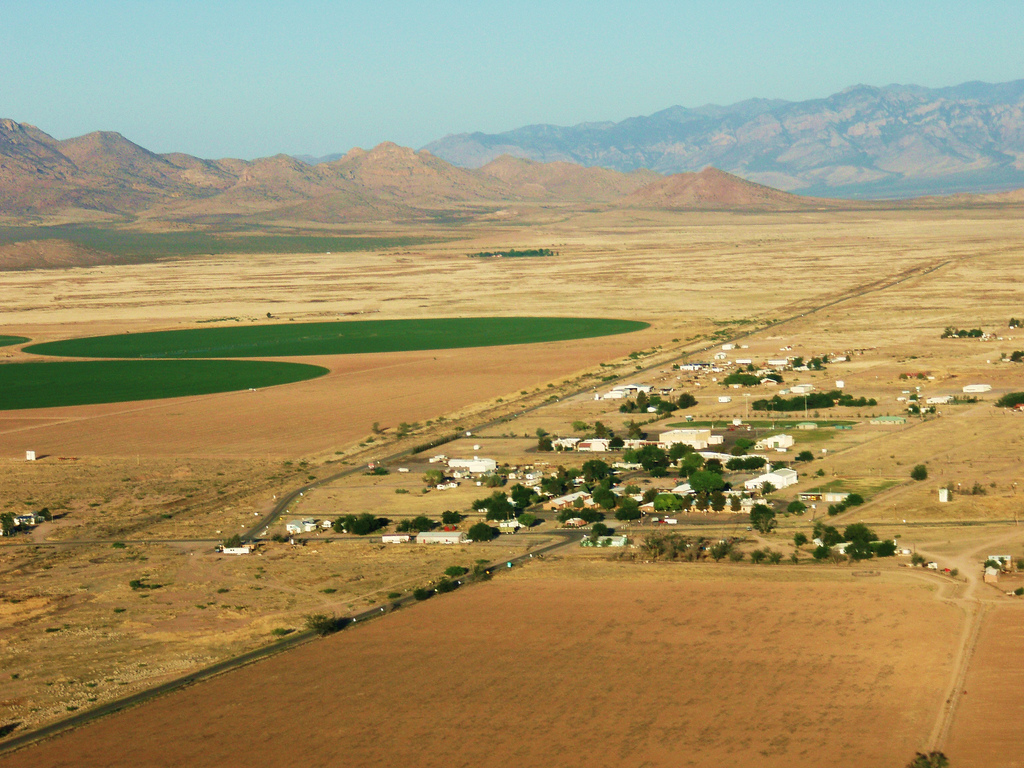
- Aerial view

- Location within New Mexico Location within the United States
- Coordinates: 31°56′56″N 108°48′46″W
- Country: United States
- State: New Mexico
- County: Hidalgo

Area
  - Total: 15.66 sq mi (40.57 km^{2})
  - Land: 15.66 sq mi (40.57 km^{2})
  - Water: 0 sq mi (0.00 km^{2})
- Elevation: 4,413 ft (1,345 m)

Population (2020)
  - Total: 180
  - Density: 11.5/sq mi (4.44/km^{2})
- Time zone: UTC-7 (Mountain (MST))
  - Summer (DST): UTC-6 (MDT)
- ZIP Code: 88020
- Area code: 575
- FIPS code: 35-03750
- GNIS feature ID: 2584046

Animas is an unincorporated community and census-designated place (CDP) in west-central Hidalgo County, New Mexico, United States, in the southwestern corner of the state. As of the 2020 census, Animas had a population of 180.

It lies at the intersection of State Roads 9 and 338, at an elevation of 4,406 feet (1,343 m) approximately 30 miles (48 km) south of the city of Lordsburg, the county seat. Although Animas is unincorporated, it has a post office, which opened in 1909, with the ZIP code of 88020.

== History ==
Founded circa 1753 by the Spanish, Animas became part of the newly independent country of Mexico in 1821. Unlike most of New Mexico, Animas was not part of the Mexican Cession after the Mexican–American War ended; it is located in the area sold to the United States with the Gadsden Purchase of 1853.

== Geography ==
Animas is an isolated ranching community. It is located in the valley bounded by the Peloncillo Mountains on the west and the Pyramid Mountains and Animas Mountains on the east. It is situated just west of the Continental Divide and is approximately 30 miles (48 km) south of Lordsburg, the nearest significant population center. Smaller communities closer to Animas include Cotton City, Playas, and Rodeo. Animas lies at the northern border of the Malpai Borderlands region. Animas lies in a region rich in Native American history—twenty-one different archeological sites in the Animas area are listed on the National Register of Historic Places.

According to the U.S. Census Bureau, the Animas census-designated place has an area of 15.7 square miles (40.6 km^{2}), all land.

=== Climate ===
Animas has a cool semi-arid climate (Köppen BSk) with hot summers and mild winters.

Climate data for Animas, New Mexico (1991–2020 normals, extremes 1923–2020)
| Month | Jan | Feb | Mar | Apr | May | Jun | Jul | Aug | Sep | Oct | Nov | Dec | Year |
|---|---|---|---|---|---|---|---|---|---|---|---|---|---|
| Record high °F (°C) | 81 (27) | 84 (29) | 92 (33) | 99 (37) | 105 (41) | 110 (43) | 110 (43) | 105 (41) | 107 (42) | 95 (35) | 86 (30) | 80 (27) | 110 (43) |
| Mean maximum °F (°C) | 69.9 (21.1) | 74.9 (23.8) | 82.0 (27.8) | 88.4 (31.3) | 96.7 (35.9) | 103.0 (39.4) | 102.3 (39.1) | 98.5 (36.9) | 95.5 (35.3) | 89.4 (31.9) | 78.9 (26.1) | 71.2 (21.8) | 104.1 (40.1) |
| Mean daily maximum °F (°C) | 57.0 (13.9) | 61.9 (16.6) | 69.2 (20.7) | 77.3 (25.2) | 85.8 (29.9) | 94.6 (34.8) | 92.9 (33.8) | 90.1 (32.3) | 86.2 (30.1) | 77.6 (25.3) | 65.9 (18.8) | 56.4 (13.6) | 76.2 (24.6) |
| Daily mean °F (°C) | 44.1 (6.7) | 48.1 (8.9) | 54.3 (12.4) | 61.2 (16.2) | 69.7 (20.9) | 78.6 (25.9) | 80.0 (26.7) | 77.9 (25.5) | 73.4 (23.0) | 63.3 (17.4) | 51.9 (11.1) | 43.8 (6.6) | 62.2 (16.8) |
| Mean daily minimum °F (°C) | 31.2 (−0.4) | 34.2 (1.2) | 39.3 (4.1) | 45.0 (7.2) | 53.6 (12.0) | 62.7 (17.1) | 67.2 (19.6) | 65.8 (18.8) | 60.6 (15.9) | 48.9 (9.4) | 38.0 (3.3) | 31.2 (−0.4) | 48.1 (8.9) |
| Mean minimum °F (°C) | 17.5 (−8.1) | 20.4 (−6.4) | 25.0 (−3.9) | 30.7 (−0.7) | 39.3 (4.1) | 50.0 (10.0) | 58.0 (14.4) | 56.8 (13.8) | 49.4 (9.7) | 33.0 (0.6) | 21.9 (−5.6) | 17.2 (−8.2) | 14.0 (−10.0) |
| Record low °F (°C) | −7 (−22) | 0 (−18) | 7 (−14) | 18 (−8) | 25 (−4) | 37 (3) | 45 (7) | 44 (7) | 33 (1) | 19 (−7) | 4 (−16) | −19 (−28) | −19 (−28) |
| Average precipitation inches (mm) | 0.71 (18) | 0.51 (13) | 0.40 (10) | 0.18 (4.6) | 0.20 (5.1) | 0.50 (13) | 2.29 (58) | 1.95 (50) | 1.00 (25) | 0.99 (25) | 0.59 (15) | 1.03 (26) | 10.35 (263) |
| Average snowfall inches (cm) | 1.7 (4.3) | 0.5 (1.3) | 0.3 (0.76) | 0.0 (0.0) | 0.0 (0.0) | 0.0 (0.0) | 0.0 (0.0) | 0.0 (0.0) | 0.0 (0.0) | 0.0 (0.0) | 0.2 (0.51) | 0.9 (2.3) | 3.6 (9.1) |
| Average precipitation days (≥ 0.01 inch) | 3.8 | 3.8 | 2.5 | 1.1 | 1.5 | 2.8 | 7.7 | 7.6 | 4.4 | 3.4 | 2.3 | 4.1 | 45.0 |
| Average snowy days (≥ 0.1 in) | 0.6 | 0.2 | 0.2 | 0.0 | 0.0 | 0.0 | 0.0 | 0.0 | 0.0 | 0.0 | 0.1 | 0.5 | 1.6 |
Source: NOAA

== Demographics ==
Historical population
| Census | Pop. | Note | %± |
|---|---|---|---|
| 2020 | 180 | | — |
U.S. Decennial Census

== Education ==
Animas is served by Animas Public Schools, which includes Animas Elementary, Middle, and High School.
