= Windmill, New Mexico =

Rural area in southern New Mexico

- Census-designated place
- Location within New Mexico Location within the United States
- Coordinates: 31°58′39″N 108°37′35″W
- Country: United States
- State: New Mexico
- County: Hidalgo

Area
  - Total: 1.44 sq mi (3.74 km^{2})
  - Land: 1.44 sq mi (3.74 km^{2})
  - Water: 0 sq mi (0.00 km^{2})
- Elevation: 4,364 ft (1,330 m)

Population (2020)
  - Total: 54
  - Density: 37.3/sq mi (14.42/km^{2})
- Time zone: UTC-7 (Mountain (MST))
  - Summer (DST): UTC-6 (MDT)
- Area code: 575
- GNIS feature ID: 2584239

Windmill is a census-designated place in Hidalgo County, New Mexico, United States. As of the 2020 census, Windmill had a population of 54. The community is located along New Mexico State Road 9.

The community was founded in the 1970s. While it is located on a windy plain, as of 1991 it did not have a windmill despite its name.

== Geography ==
According to the U.S. Census Bureau, the community has an area of 1.446 square miles (3.75 km^{2}), all land.

== Demographics ==
Historical population
Census	Pop.	Note	%±
2020	54		—
U.S. Decennial Census
