= Separ, New Mexico =

Unincorporated community in New Mexico, United States

Separ
- Unincorporated community
- Location within New Mexico Location within the United States
- Coordinates: 32°12′03″N 108°25′20″W
- Country: United States
- State: New Mexico
- County: Grant
- Elevation: 4,501 ft (1,372 m)
- Time zone: UTC-7 (Mountain (MST))
  - Summer (DST): UTC-6 (MDT)
- ZIP codes: 88045
- Area code: 575
- GNIS feature ID: 899905

Separ is an unincorporated community in Grant County in the bootheel of southwestern New Mexico, in the southwestern United States. Separ lies in the endorheic Guzmán Basin; as a result the continental divide passes both to the west and east of it. Located alongside the tracks of the Union Pacific, it flourished in the late 19th and early 20th century as a watering station and livestock transfer point. Separ is located alongside Interstate 10, about 20 miles (32 km) southeast of Lordsburg and 48 miles (77 km) west of Deming. Today it is a "service point for truck and car traffic".

== History ==
Separ was a watering and overnight stop on the Janos Trail, which conveyed copper ore south to smelters in Chihuahua and mining equipment and trade goods north to the copper mines. It was originally called Sepas. When the railroad came through in the 1880s, it became a loading station for cattle.

At about 8:00 pm, on July 20, 1896, the outlaw Black Jack Christian and his High Five Gang robbed a general store in Separ belonging to John D. Weems. Bob Hayes and Bob Christian probably waited outside to watch the horses and keep a lookout while Black Jack, George Musgrave and Code Young went in with masks over their faces. The bandits took about $250 in cash and merchandise, including a large Navajo blanket, six wool blankets, three boxes of cigars, and some whiskey. They also robbed the post office next door. A couple of months later, deputies eventually found the Navajo blanket at a residence in the foothills of the Chiricahua Mountains. It had been given away by Code Young.

In March 1905, George and Edwin Gates, two infamous outlaws, were killed in Separ.
