= Puerto Palomas, Chihuahua =

Puerto Palomas de Villa Palomas
- Town
- Mexican port of entry at Puerto Palomas

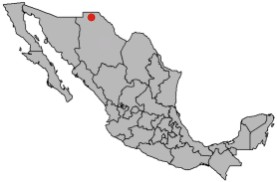
- Map showing Palomas within Mexico

- Map showing Palomas in Chihuahua state
- Coordinates: 31°46′16″N 107°38′08″W
- Country: Mexico
- State: Chihuahua
- Municipality: Ascensión
- Elevation: 1,200 m (3,900 ft)

Population (2010)
  - Total: 4,688
- Website: www.palomasmexico.com

Puerto Palomas de Villa, also known simply as Palomas or as General Rodrigo M. Quevedo, is a small town of 4,688 people in the municipality of Ascensión, in the Mexican state of Chihuahua. It borders the village of Columbus, New Mexico, in the United States.

== Geography and climate ==
Palomas is located in the Chihuahuan Desert at an approximate elevation of 1,200 metres (3,900 ft) above sea level. Because of this rather high elevation, in addition to its location in far north Mexico, it receives about 5 inches of snow each year.

== Tourism ==
Puerto Palomas is an alternative border crossing for the El Paso area, approximately 90 minutes west of El Paso.

== History ==
Pancho Villa launched his attack on Columbus, New Mexico, on March 9, 1916, from Palomas. In retaliation, the United States launched the Pancho Villa Expedition, under General John J. Pershing, to capture him. Notwithstanding more than a year of effort, including one of the first large-scale uses of motorized transport by the U.S. Army, Pancho Villa was not captured. During this campaign, a young Lt. George S. Patton, later to be known as General Patton, became famous. During his service and accompanied by ten soldiers of the 6th Infantry Regiment, Patton killed two Mexican leaders, including "General" Julio Cárdenas, commander of Villa's personal bodyguard. For this action, as well as Patton's affinity for the Colt Peacemaker, Pershing titled Patton his "Bandito." Patton's success in this regard gained him a level of fame in the United States, and he was featured in newspapers across the nation.

== Education ==
Several public schools are located in Palomas. These schools require fees to be paid from the households of the students.

As of the 2013–2014 school year, 421 residents of Palomas attend the schools of Deming Public Schools in the United States. Many children living in Palomas are U.S. citizens because the U.S. federal and New Mexico state policies allow women in Palomas to give birth in the nearest hospital, which is in Deming, on the U.S. side of the border. Birth in the United States automatically confers citizenship. Due to the school fees at the public schools in Palomas, the English-language education, and the higher quality facilities in the Deming Public Schools campuses, many parents resident in Palomas prefer to send their children to the schools in the United States. Almost 75% of students at Columbus Elementary School in Columbus, New Mexico, the DPS school closest to the Mexico–United States border, live in Palomas and have parents who are Mexicans.

Photos of Palomas
The border wall west of Puerto Palomas

Statute of Pancho Villa and John Pershing

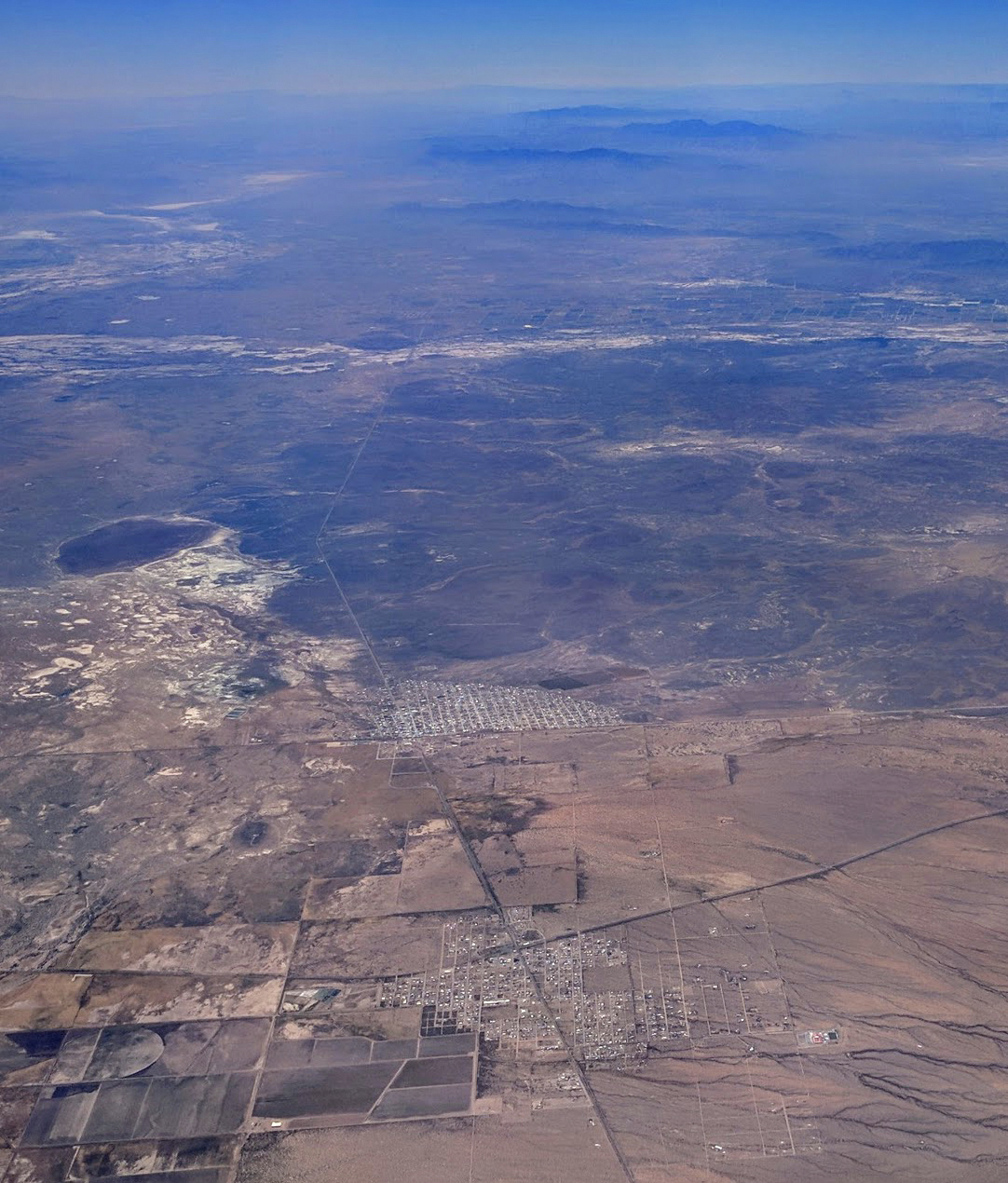
In this aerial photograph looking over Columbus, New Mexico (foreground), Puerto Palomas is in the center, with its near edge defining the international border.

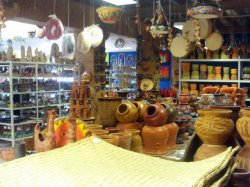
The Pink Store

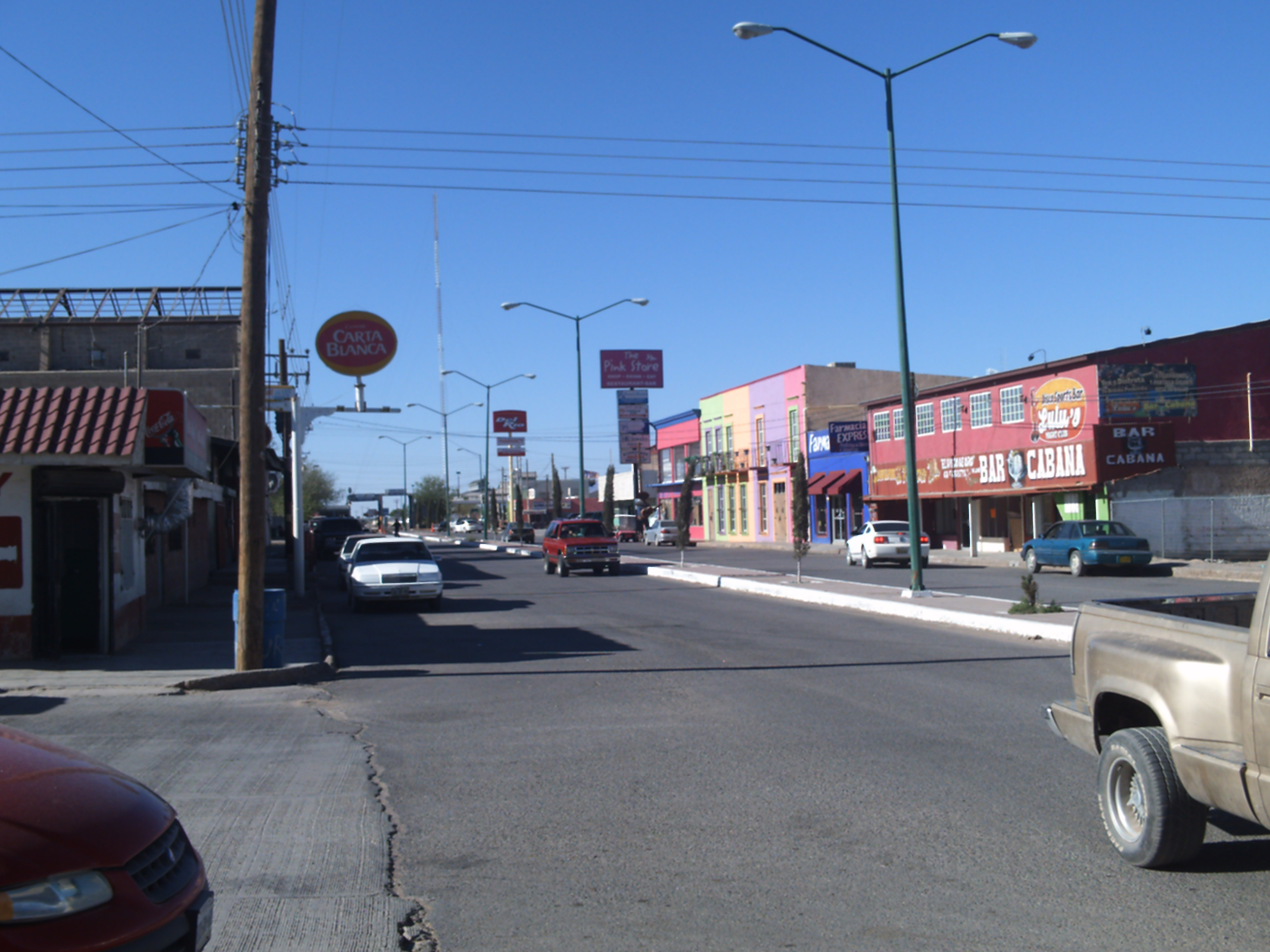
The high street in 2008
