= Columbus, New Mexico =

- Village
- View of Columbus from Pancho Villa State Park

- Location of Columbus, New Mexico

- Location in the United States
- Coordinates: 31°49′50″N 107°38′28″W
- Country: United States
- State: New Mexico
- County: Luna
- Founded: 1891

Government
  - Mayor: Esequiel Salas

Area
  - Total: 4.67 sq mi (12.09 km^{2})
  - Land: 4.67 sq mi (12.09 km^{2})
  - Water: 0 sq mi (0.00 km^{2})
- Elevation: 4,072 ft (1,241 m)

Population (2020)
  - Total: 1,442
  - Density: 309.0/sq mi (119.32/km^{2})
- Time zone: UTC-7 (Mountain (MST))
  - Summer (DST): UTC-6 (MDT)
- ZIP code: 88029
- Area code: 575
- FIPS code: 35-17050
- GNIS feature ID: 2413542
- Website: www.historicvillageofcolumbus.org/index.html

Columbus is an incorporated village in Luna County, New Mexico, United States, about 3 miles (5 km) north of the Mexican border. It is considered a place of historical interest, as the scene of a 1916 attack by Mexican general Francisco "Pancho" Villa that caused the United States to send 10,000 troops there in the Mexican Expedition (originally referred to as the "punitive Mexican Expedition"). As of the 2020 census, Columbus had a population of 1,442.

== History ==
=== Early history (1891–1910s) ===
Columbus was established in 1891 just across the Mexican border from Palomas, Chihuahua, and named after 15th-century explorer Christopher Columbus. In 1902, the village center was moved 3 miles (5 km) north when the El Paso and Southwestern Railroad built its Columbus station. This station is now converted into a museum run by the Columbus Historical Society.

About 1905, it was a very small town with a population of about 100, two of those early settlers being Colonel Andrew O. Bailey and Louis Heller. By this time, Columbus had only one general store, a saloon, and a society inspector. In time, a high school was built, and Perrow G. Mosely established the Columbus News, which later was renamed the Columbus Courier. By 1915, the town had 700 residents, the Columbus State Bank was built, four hotels were constructed, and several stores and a Baptist church were also established. At that time, the area around Columbus also had rich silver, copper, lead, and zinc deposits.

=== 1916 Pancho Villa raid ===
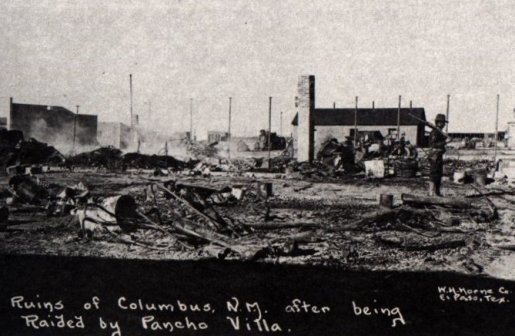
Columbus after Villa's raid

On March 9, 1916, on the orders of Mexican revolutionary leader Pancho Villa, Colonel Francisco Beltrán, Colonel Candelario Cervantes, General Nicolás Fernández, General Pablo López, and others led 500 men in an attack against the town, which was garrisoned by a detachment of the 13th Cavalry Regiment. Villa's army burned a part of the town and killed seven or eight soldiers and 10 residents before retreating back into Mexico.

United States President Woodrow Wilson responded to the Columbus raid by sending 10,000 troops under Brigadier General John J. Pershing to Mexico to pursue Villa. This was known as the Punitive Mexican Expedition or Pancho Villa Expedition. The expedition was eventually called off after failing to find Villa, who had escaped. The Pershing expedition brought prosperity and international attention to Columbus and a realization that war had come to the border of the United States.

=== From 1926 to the 1990s ===
In 1926 after the Punitive Expedition ended, Columbus started to change and decay over the decades. Camp Furlong activity was greatly reduced. The army decided to close their camp, and the El Paso and Southwestern Railroad stopped service in Columbus. After all these events, the economy naturally faded over time.

In the 1990s, Columbus started to revitalize, with the development of city and state parks, museums, RV parks, and history involving the city.

=== 2011 gun-smuggling scandal ===
In July 2011, Columbus dissolved its police force after a gun-smuggling scandal that involved its village officials and others. The mayor, a village trustee, a former police chief, and nine other people were indicted in the scandal. The case was prosecuted by the United States Attorney from El Paso, Texas, before United States District Court Judge Robert Brack in Las Cruces, New Mexico. Of the 11 people charged, 10 pleaded guilty, with one person still at large. Sentences ranged from five years in federal prison to two years' probation.

== Geography ==
Columbus is in southern Luna County about 3 miles (5 km) north of the border between the United States and Mexico. The village limits extend south to the international border. The Mexican village of Puerto Palomas, Chihuahua, is across the border.

New Mexico State Road 11 leads north from Columbus 32 miles (51 km) to Deming, the Luna county seat, while State Road 9 leads east 59 miles (95 km) to Santa Teresa and west 44 miles (71 km) to Hachita.

According to the United States Census Bureau, the village of Columbus has a total area of 4.7 square miles (12.1 km^{2}), all land.

=== Climate ===
The climate is a cold semi-arid (Köppen: BSk) like much of New Mexico's lower elevations outside El Paso–Juárez.

Climate data for Columbus (Columbus Municipal Airport), elevation: 1,268 m or 4,160 ft, 1981–2010 normals, (Note: Except snowfall (1909–2012)) extremes 1923–2011
Month	Jan	Feb	Mar	Apr	May	Jun	Jul	Aug	Sep	Oct	Nov	Dec	Year
Record high °F (°C)	80 (27)	86 (30)	91 (33)	98 (37)	105 (41)	111 (44)	109 (43)	107 (42)	103 (39)	96 (36)	86 (30)	80 (27)	111 (44)
Mean maximum °F (°C)	71.0 (21.7)	76.5 (24.7)	82.4 (28.0)	89.4 (31.9)	96.9 (36.1)	104.2 (40.1)	103.9 (39.9)	100.0 (37.8)	96.5 (35.8)	89.3 (31.8)	79.0 (26.1)	71.0 (21.7)	105.0 (40.6)
Mean daily maximum °F (°C)	59.4 (15.2)	64.8 (18.2)	71.9 (22.2)	80.0 (26.7)	89.1 (31.7)	96.9 (36.1)	96.1 (35.6)	93.0 (33.9)	89.2 (31.8)	80.2 (26.8)	68.0 (20.0)	58.6 (14.8)	78.9 (26.1)
Daily mean °F (°C)	45.2 (7.3)	49.9 (9.9)	56.0 (13.3)	63.6 (17.6)	72.8 (22.7)	81.3 (27.4)	82.5 (28.1)	80.1 (26.7)	75.3 (24.1)	65.0 (18.3)	53.0 (11.7)	44.7 (7.1)	64.1 (17.8)
Mean daily minimum °F (°C)	31.0 (−0.6)	35.1 (1.7)	40.1 (4.5)	47.2 (8.4)	56.6 (13.7)	65.6 (18.7)	68.9 (20.5)	67.3 (19.6)	61.4 (16.3)	49.9 (9.9)	38.0 (3.3)	30.9 (−0.6)	49.3 (9.6)
Mean minimum °F (°C)	15.1 (−9.4)	19.5 (−6.9)	24.3 (−4.3)	32.0 (0.0)	41.6 (5.3)	52.6 (11.4)	61.2 (16.2)	59.7 (15.4)	48.9 (9.4)	35.1 (1.7)	21.8 (−5.7)	16.1 (−8.8)	10.6 (−11.9)
Record low °F (°C)	−12 (−24)	5 (−15)	10 (−12)	19 (−7)	28 (−2)	43 (6)	54 (12)	52 (11)	39 (4)	17 (−8)	2 (−17)	−7 (−22)	−12 (−24)
Average precipitation inches (mm)	0.54 (14)	0.47 (12)	0.33 (8.4)	0.27 (6.9)	0.27 (6.9)	0.61 (15)	2.17 (55)	2.20 (56)	1.25 (32)	0.88 (22)	0.55 (14)	0.80 (20)	10.34 (262.2)
Average snowfall inches (cm)	0.77 (2.0)	0.40 (1.0)	0.23 (0.58)	0.06 (0.15)	0.0 (0.0)	0.0 (0.0)	0.0 (0.0)	0.0 (0.0)	0.0 (0.0)	0.0 (0.0)	0.25 (0.64)	1.28 (3.3)	2.99 (7.67)
Source: WRCC

== Demographics ==
Historical population
Census	Pop.	Note	%±
1920	2,110		—
1930	391		−81.5%
1940	265		−32.2%
1950	251		−5.3%
1960	307		22.3%
1970	241		−21.5%
1980	414		71.8%
1990	641		54.8%
2000	1,765		175.4%
2010	1,664		−5.7%
2020	1,442		−13.3%
U.S. Decennial Census

As of the census of 2000, there were 1,765 people, 536 households, and 411 families residing in the village. The population density was 635.3 inhabitants per square mile (245.3/km^{2}). There were 720 housing units at an average density of 259.2 per square mile (100.1/km^{2}). The racial makeup of the village was 70.4% White, 0.7% African American, 0.6% Native American, 0.1% Asian, 25.5% from other races, and 2.8% from two or more races. Hispanic or Latino of any race were 83.4% of the population.

There were 536 households, out of which 50.2% had children under the age of 18 living with them, 61.8% were married couples living together, 10.6% had a female householder with no husband present, and 23.3% were non-families. 20.5% of all households were made up of individuals, and 12.5% had someone living alone who was 65 years of age or older. The average household size was 3.29 and the average family size was 3.89.

In the village, the population was spread out, with 39.2% under the age of 18, 7.7% from 18 to 24, 22.0% from 25 to 44, 18.6% from 45 to 64, and 12.5% who were 65 years of age or older. The median age was 28 years. For every 100 females, there were 100.8 males. For every 100 females age 18 and over, there were 99.6 males.

The median income for a household in the village was $13,773, and the median income for a family was $14,318. Males had a median income of $16,912 versus $12,344 for females. The per capita income for the village was $6,721. About 56.7% of families and 57.1% of the population were below the poverty line, including 67.0% of those under age 18 and 20.2% of those age 65 or over.

In 2010, Columbus had the 21st-lowest median household income of all places in the United States with a population over 1,000.

== Education ==
Columbus Elementary School is part of the Deming Public Schools District.

Columbus Elementary School is located 30 miles south of Deming, New Mexico and 3 miles north of Palomas, Chihuahua, across the border in Mexico. About 90% of the students come from homes where Spanish is the dominant language. The staff at Columbus Elementary is required to be bilingually endorsed or working toward bilingual endorsement. The mission of Columbus Elementary School is to build on the students' bicultural and bilingual environment; they work in partnership with the parents and the community to enable students to reach their full potential.

Students from Columbus and Puerto Palomas attend Columbus Elementary from preschool up to fifth grade. Students then move on to attend Deming Intermediate School (6) in Deming, Red Mountain Middle School (7–8), and Deming High School (9–12).

Deming Public Schools buses U.S. citizen students residing in Mexico (including the city of Palomas) from the United States-Mexico border to Columbus Elementary and to upper grades in Deming.

== Columbus Village Library ==
Columbus Village Library, the town's only public library, is located at 112 West Broadway. Around 22,386 visits to this local library occur annually. Columbus Village Library has 14,989 books and serial volumes, 343 audios, 1,428 videos, and 30 computers.

== City of the Sun ==
An intentional community called City of the Sun is on the northern edge of Columbus. Started in 1972, the community has many unique, experimental homes. Members of the community aim "to serve the Divine Purpose in community living with other Light Seekers."

== In popular culture ==
Pancho Villa's raid on Columbus is depicted in the novel The Friends of Pancho Villa (1996) by James Carlos Blake. In Spring Break Adventure, the sixth film in The Adventures of Young Indiana Jones series, Indiana Jones and his cousin are in town during Pancho Villa's raid, and he ends up joining Pancho Villa's army.

Columbus features in the 2008 film The Shepherd: Border Patrol starring Jean-Claude Van Damme. The 1989 cult classic Sonny Boy has Columbus-based locations.

== See also ==
Village of Columbus Tourism Center

- Village of Columbus and Camp Furlong, a U.S. National Historic Landmark District
- Columbus Air Force
- Susan Parks
