= Hachita, New Mexico =

Census-designated place in Grant County, New Mexico, United States

- Census-designated place
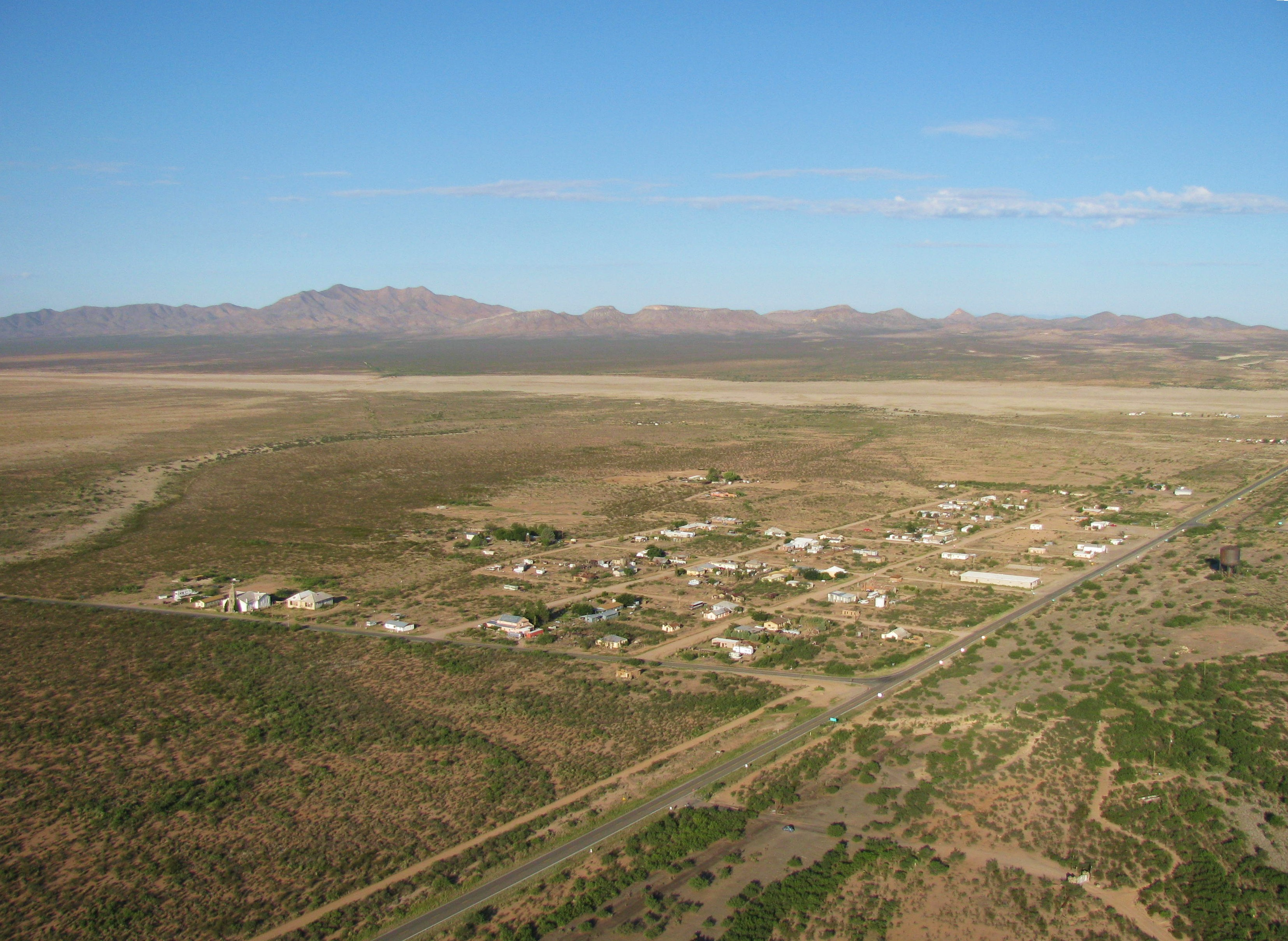
- Hachita (2009)

- Location within New Mexico Location within the United States
- Coordinates: 31°54′55″N 108°19′31″W
- Country: United States
- State: New Mexico
- County: Grant

Area
  - Total: 0.44 sq mi (1.15 km^{2})
  - Land: 0.44 sq mi (1.15 km^{2})
  - Water: 0 sq mi (0.00 km^{2})
- Elevation: 4,511 ft (1,375 m)

Population (2020)
  - Total: 52
  - Density: 117/sq mi (45.3/km^{2})
- Time zone: UTC-07:00 (MST)
  - Summer (DST): UTC-06:00 (MDT)
- ZIP code: 88040
- Area code: 575
- GNIS feature ID: 2584106

Hachita is a census-designated place in Grant County, New Mexico, United States. As of the 2020 census, Hachita had a population of 52. Hachita has a post office with ZIP code 88040. New Mexico State Road 9, New Mexico State Road 81, and New Mexico State Road 146 pass through the community. The ghost town of Old Hachita is several miles west of the town.

== Demographics ==
Historical population
Census	Pop.	Note	%±
2020	52		—
U.S. Decennial Census

This is also near the Crazy Cook Monument, which marks the starting point of the Continental Divide Trail, this trail is from this border to the Canada border.

== See also ==
- List of census-designated places in New Mexico
