= Cotton City, New Mexico =

- Census-designated place
- Location within New Mexico Location within the United States
- Coordinates: 32°06′38″N 108°52′45″W
- Country: United States
- State: New Mexico
- County: Hidalgo

Area
  - Total: 25.82 sq mi (66.87 km^{2})
  - Land: 25.82 sq mi (66.87 km^{2})
  - Water: 0 sq mi (0.00 km^{2})
- Elevation: 4,223 ft (1,287 m)

Population (2020)
  - Total: 266
  - Density: 10.3/sq mi (3.98/km^{2})
- Time zone: UTC-7 (Mountain (MST))
  - Summer (DST): UTC-6 (MDT)
- Area code: 575
- GNIS feature ID: 2584082

Cotton City is a census-designated place in Hidalgo County, New Mexico, United States. As of the 2020 census, Cotton City had a population of 266. New Mexico State Road 338 passes through the community.

The community was named for its cotton gin, which serves the area's cotton farms.

== Geography ==
According to the U.S. Census Bureau, the community has an area of 25.517 square miles (66.09 km^{2}), all land.

== Demographics ==
Historical population
Census	Pop.	Note	%±
2020	266		—
U.S. Decennial Census
