= Rodeo, New Mexico =

Unincorporated community in New Mexico, United States

- Census-designated place
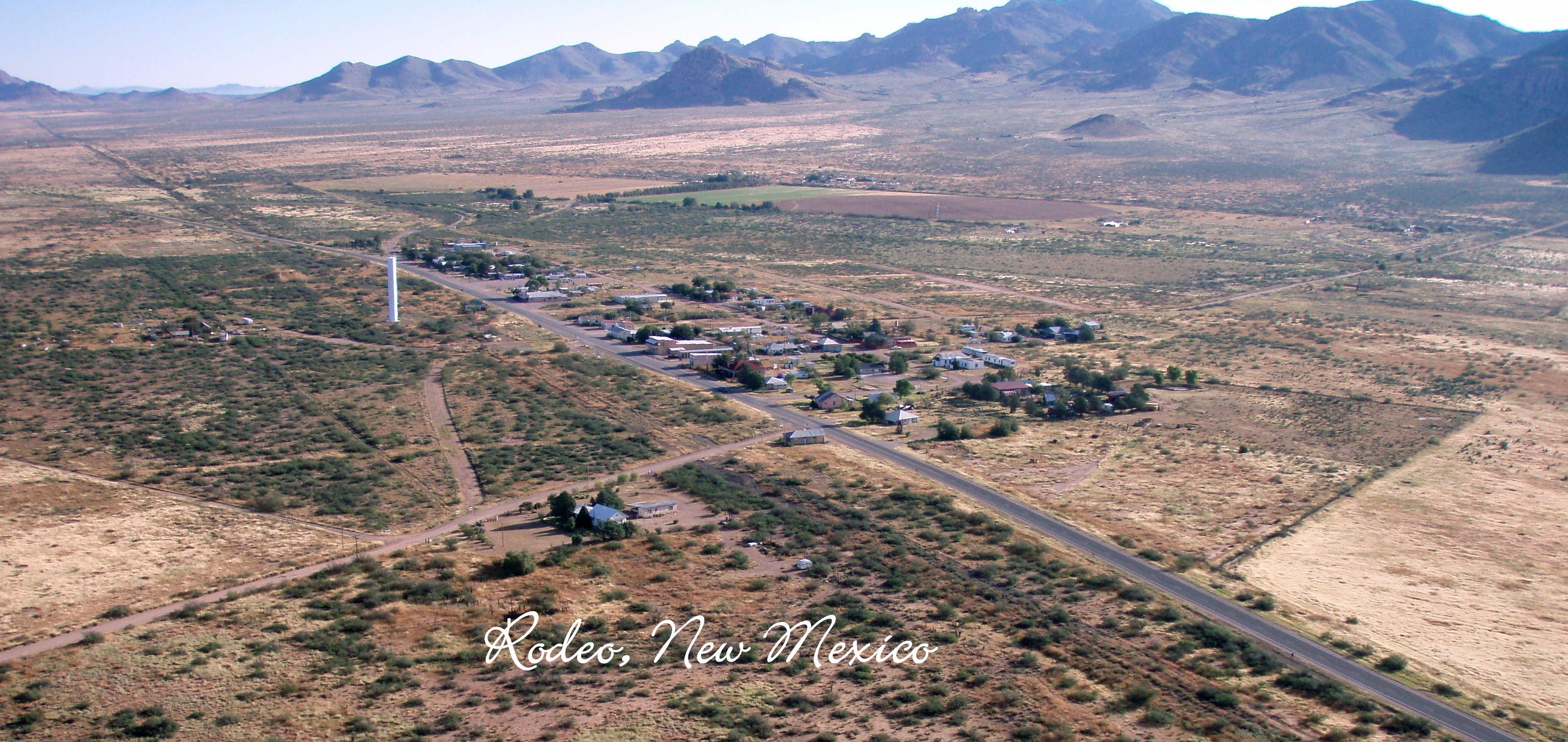

- Location within New Mexico Location within the United States
- Coordinates: 31°50′23″N 109°01′36″W
- Country: United States
- State: New Mexico
- County: Hidalgo
- Established: 1902

Area
  - Total: 8.19 sq mi (21.22 km^{2})
  - Land: 8.19 sq mi (21.22 km^{2})
  - Water: 0 sq mi (0.00 km^{2})
- Elevation: 4,124 ft (1,257 m)

Population (2020)
  - Total: 108
  - Density: 13.2/sq mi (5.09/km^{2})
- ZIP Code: 88056
- Area code: 575
- FIPS code: 35-64370
- GNIS feature ID: 2584194
- Website: www.hidalgocounty.org

Rodeo is a census-designated place (CDP) in Hidalgo County, New Mexico, United States. It lies less than one mile (1.6 km) from the border with Arizona on New Mexico State Road 80. As of the 2020 census, Rodeo had a population of 108.

== History ==
Founded in 1902 as a rail stop on the El Paso and Southwestern Railroad line running from Bisbee, Arizona to El Paso, Texas, it became the center for cattle shipping in the San Simon Valley. The toponym Rodeo originated as Spanish rodeo, meaning "roundup" or "enclosure", or more specifically "place where cattle are gathered" (Sitio donde se reúne el ganado), derived from the Spanish verb rodear meaning "to surround, encircle". The El Paso and Southwestern railroad runs east across the southern part of the state and after passing through Antelope Pass turns south to Rodeo continuing to Douglas, Arizona, and then north to Bisbee, going around the Chiricahua Mountains.

== Geography ==
Rodeo is in western Hidalgo County, bordering the state of Arizona. New Mexico Highway 80 leads north 30 miles (48 km) to Interstate 10 at Road Forks and southwest 2 miles (3 km) to the state line, continuing as Arizona State Route 80 southwest another 48 miles (77 km) to Douglas, Arizona. Lordsburg, the Hidalgo County seat, is 47 miles (76 km) to the northeast via Highway 80 and I-10.

According to the U.S. Census Bureau, the Rodeo CDP has an area of 8.2 square miles (21.2 km^{2}), all land.

== Demographics ==
Historical population
| Census | Pop. | Note | %± |
|---|---|---|---|
| 2020 | 108 | | — |
U.S. Decennial Census

== See also ==
- List of census-designated places in New Mexico
