= Box Canyon =

Box Canyon may refer to:

- Box Canyon (Colorado), a canyon in Ouray County, Colorado
- Earl M. Hardy Box Canyon Springs Nature Preserve, in Thousand Springs State Park, Idaho; sometimes referred to as "Box Canyon State Park"
- Box Canyon (Borrego Springs, California), a California Historical Landmark
- Box Canyon (Doña Ana County, New Mexico), a canyon in Doña Ana County, New Mexico
- Box Canyon Site, an archaeological site in Hidalgo County, New Mexico
- Box Canyon, Texas, a census-designated place in Val Verde County, Texas
- Box canyon (aviation), a narrow canyon hazardous to aircraft

== See also ==
- Box Canyon Dam (disambiguation)
