= Lordsburg–Hidalgo County =

Lordsburg—Hidalgo County, Lordsburg, Hidalgo County, or Lordsburg Hidalgo County may refer to:

- Lordsburg, New Mexico, the county seat of Hidalgo County, New Mexico, US
  - Lordsburg-Hidalgo County Library
  - Lordsburg Hidalgo County Museum

== See also ==
- Lordsburg (disambiguation)
- Hidalgo County (disambiguation)
- Hidalgo (disambiguation)
