= Lordsburg (disambiguation) =

Lordsburg is the county seat of Hidalgo County, New Mexico, US.

Lordsburg may also refer to:

- La Verne, California or Lordsburg, California, US
  - Lordsburg College, a private college in La Verne, California, US
- Lordsburg Township, Bottineau County, North Dakota, US
- Camp Lordsburg, a WWII prisoner-of-war and internment camp in New Mexico during World War II
- Lordsburg station, an Amtrak station in Lordsburg, New Mexico, US

== See also ==
- List of New Mexico railroads
- Lordsburg killings
- Lordsburg–Hidalgo County (disambiguation)
- Old Lordsburg High School, Lordsburg, Hidalgo, NM, USA
- Lordstown (disambiguation)
- Lordville (disambiguation)
