= Hidalgo =

Hidalgo may refer to:

== People ==
- Hidalgo (nobility), members of the Spanish nobility
- Hidalgo (surname)

== Places ==
=== Mexico ===
Most, if not all, named for Miguel Hidalgo y Costilla (1753–1811)

- Hidalgo (state), in central Mexico
- Hidalgo, Coahuila, a town in the state of Coahuila
- Hidalgo, Nuevo León, a city in the state of Nuevo León
- Hidalgo, Tamaulipas, a municipality in the state of Tamaulipas
- Miguel Hidalgo, Mexico City, one of the city's 16 constituent boroughs
- Hidalgo Yalalag, Oaxaca
- Frontera Hidalgo, Chiapas
- Ciudad Hidalgo, Chiapas
- Ciudad Hidalgo, Michoacán
- Sabinas Hidalgo, Nuevo León
- Villa Hidalgo, Baja California
- Villa Hidalgo (Villaflores), Chiapas
- Villa Hidalgo (Tuzantán), Chiapas
- Villa Hidalgo, Coahuila
- Villa Hidalgo, Durango
- Villa Hidalgo, Jalisco
- Villa Hidalgo, Nayarit
- Villa Hidalgo, San Luis Potosí
- Villa Hidalgo, Sonora
- Villa Hidalgo, Tamaulipas
- Villa Hidalgo, Zacatecas
- Villa Hidalgo (Santa Rita), Zacatecas

=== United States ===
- Hidalgo, Illinois
- Hidalgo, Texas
- Hidalgo County, New Mexico
- Hidalgo County, Texas

=== Dominican Republic ===
- Los Hidalgos, Dominican Republic

=== Philippines ===
- Hidalgo Street, Quiapo, Manila, Philippines

=== Fiction ===
- Hidalgo, name of a fictional country in Central America in the Doc Savage stories

== Transportation ==
- Hidalgo metro station, in Mexico City
- Hidalgo (Mexico City Metrobús, Line 3), a BRT station in Mexico City
- Hidalgo (Mexico City Metrobús, Line 4), a BRT station in Mexico City
- Hidalgo (Mexico City Metrobús, Line 7), a BRT station in Mexico City
- Hidalgo (Mexibús), a BRT station in Ecatepec, State of Mexico

== Other uses ==
- 944 Hidalgo, an asteroid
- Hidalgo (film), a 2004 film based on the legend of the American distance rider Frank Hopkins and his mustang Hidalgo
- Hidalgo (moth), a moth genus
- Hidalgo (Sherry), a Spanish Sherry producer

== See also ==
- Hidalgo County (disambiguation)
