= National Register of Historic Places listings in Hidalgo County, New Mexico =

Location of Hidalgo County in New Mexico

This is a list of the National Register of Historic Places listings in Hidalgo County, New Mexico.

This is intended to be a complete list of the properties and districts on the National Register of Historic Places in Hidalgo County, New Mexico, United States. Latitude and longitude coordinates are provided for many National Register properties and districts; these locations may be seen together in a map.

There are 25 properties and districts listed on the National Register in the county. Another property was once listed but has been removed. All of the places within the county on the National Register are also listed on the State Register of Cultural Properties.

This National Park Service list is complete through NPS recent listings posted December 12, 2025.

Contents: NRHP in New Mexico by county
Bernalillo – Catron – Chaves – Cibola – Colfax – Curry – De Baca – Doña Ana – Eddy – Grant – Guadalupe – Harding – Hidalgo – Lea – Lincoln – Los Alamos – Luna – McKinley – Mora – Otero – Quay – Rio Arriba – Roosevelt – San Juan – San Miguel – Sandoval – Santa Fe – Sierra – Socorro – Taos – Torrance – Union – Valencia

== Current listings ==
	Name on the Register	Image	Date listed	Location	City or town	Description
1	Alamo Hueco Site		January 28, 1993 (#92001800)	Address Restricted	Animas	In the Alamo Hueco Mountains
2	Archeological Site No. LA 54021		January 23, 1993 (#92001802)	Address Restricted	Animas	
3	Archeological Site No. LA 54042		January 23, 1993 (#92001811)	Address Restricted	Animas	
4	Archeological Site No. LA 54049		January 23, 1993 (#92001813)	Address Restricted	Animas	
5	Archeological Site No. LA 54050		January 23, 1993 (#92001814)	Address Restricted	Animas	
6	Box Canyon Site		January 28, 1993 (#92001796)	Address Restricted	Animas	
7	Brushy Creek Ruin		January 28, 1993 (#92001815)	Address Restricted	Animas	
8	Clanton Draw Site		January 28, 1993 (#92001795)	Address Restricted	Animas	
9	Culberson Ruin		January 28, 1993 (#92001799)	Address Restricted	Animas	
10	Double Adobe Creek Site		January 28, 1993 (#92001807)	Address Restricted	Animas	
11	Fortress-Stewart Ranch Site		January 23, 1993 (#92001803)	Address Restricted	Animas	
12	Hidalgo County Courthouse	Hidalgo County Courthouse	December 7, 1987 (#87000897)	300 S. Shakespeare St. 32°20′52″N 108°42′26″W	Lordsburg	
13	Hoskins Site		January 28, 1993 (#92001804)	Address Restricted	Animas	
14	Joyce Well Site		January 28, 1993 (#92001798)	Address Restricted	Animas	
15	Little Site		January 28, 1993 (#92001805)	Address Restricted	Animas	
16	Lordsburg-Hidalgo County Library	Lordsburg-Hidalgo County Library	February 4, 2004 (#03001547)	208 E. 3rd St. 32°20′53″N 108°42′28″W	Lordsburg	
17	Lordsburg High School	Lordsburg High School	September 17, 2015 (#15000606)	209 Penn St. 32°20′59″N 108°42′42″W	Lordsburg	The old high school building.
18	Lunch Box Site		January 28, 1993 (#92001801)	Address Restricted	Animas	
19	Metate Ruin		January 28, 1993 (#92001812)	Address Restricted	Animas	
20	Pendleton Ruin		January 28, 1993 (#92001794)	Address Restricted	Animas	
21	Pigpen Creek Site		January 28, 1993 (#92001806)	Address Restricted	Animas	
22	Saddle Bronc-Battleground Site		January 28, 1993 (#92001810)	Address Restricted	Animas	
23	Shakespeare Ghost Town	Shakespeare Ghost Town	July 16, 1973 (#73001141)	Southwest of Lordsburg, off State Road 494; 32°19′32″N 108°44′18″W	Lordsburg	
24	Sycamore Well Site		January 28, 1993 (#92001797)	Address Restricted	Animas	
25	Timberlake Ruin-Walnut Creek Site		January 28, 1993 (#92001809)	Address Restricted	Animas	

== Former listing ==
	Name on the Register	Image	Date listed	Date removed	Location	City or town	Description
1	Cloverdale Park Site		1992 (#92001808)	September 19, 1995	Address Restricted	Animas	

== See also ==
- List of National Historic Landmarks in New Mexico
- National Register of Historic Places listings in New Mexico
