= Picacho, Dona Ana County, New Mexico =

Picacho
- Census-designated place
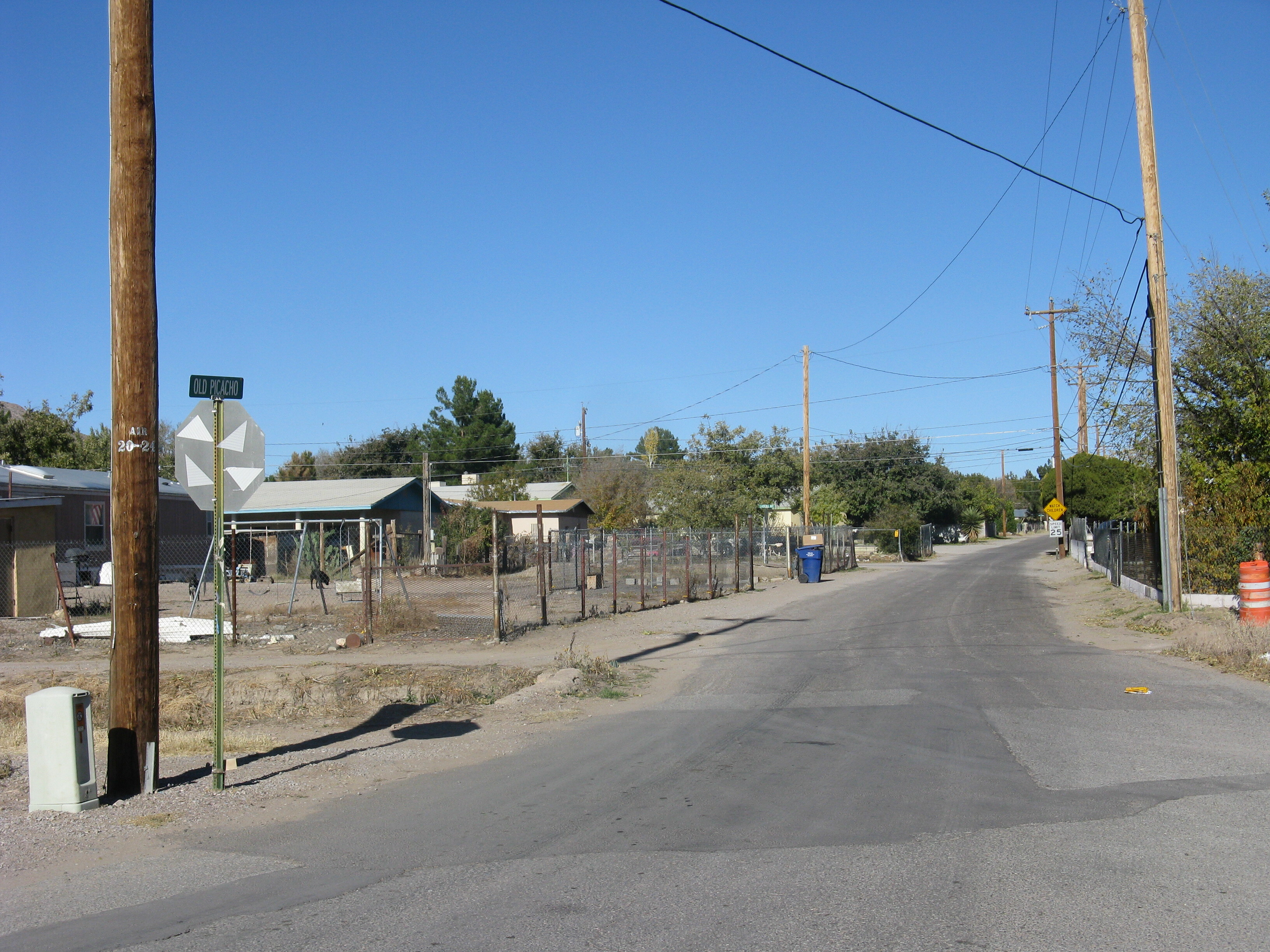
- Butterfield Station site at Picacho

- Location within New Mexico Picacho (the United States)
- Coordinates: 32°19′42″N 106°51′20″W
- Country: United States
- State: New Mexico
- County: Doña Ana
- Elevation: 3,947 ft (1,203 m)

Picacho is a census-designated place in Doña Ana County, New Mexico, United States. It lies at an elevation of 3,947 feet (1,203 m).

== History ==
=== Picacho de los Nevarez ===
The village of Picacho was originally settled in 1855 by a group of settlers from Socorro, New Mexico, led by Candelaro Chavez. The original name of the village was Picacho de los Nevarez, derived from Picacho Mountain, which was named after the Nevarez family.

=== Picacho Station ===
Picacho was the site of Picacho Station, a stagecoach station of the 4th Division of the Butterfield Overland Mail from 1858 to 1861. Located in the village, it was about 6 miles west and north of Mesilla, New Mexico and 15 miles east of Rough and Ready Station. The route passed through Picacho Pass before reaching the village.

This station had the last natural water source available on the route westward until Cooke's Spring, 52 miles away. Later stations, including Goodsight Station and Rough and Ready, transported water and constructed earthen tanks to store rainwater.

The site of the station is located at 32°16′23″N 106°47′40″W.
