= Atalaya Mountain (Santa Fe County, New Mexico) =

Mountain in New Mexico, United States

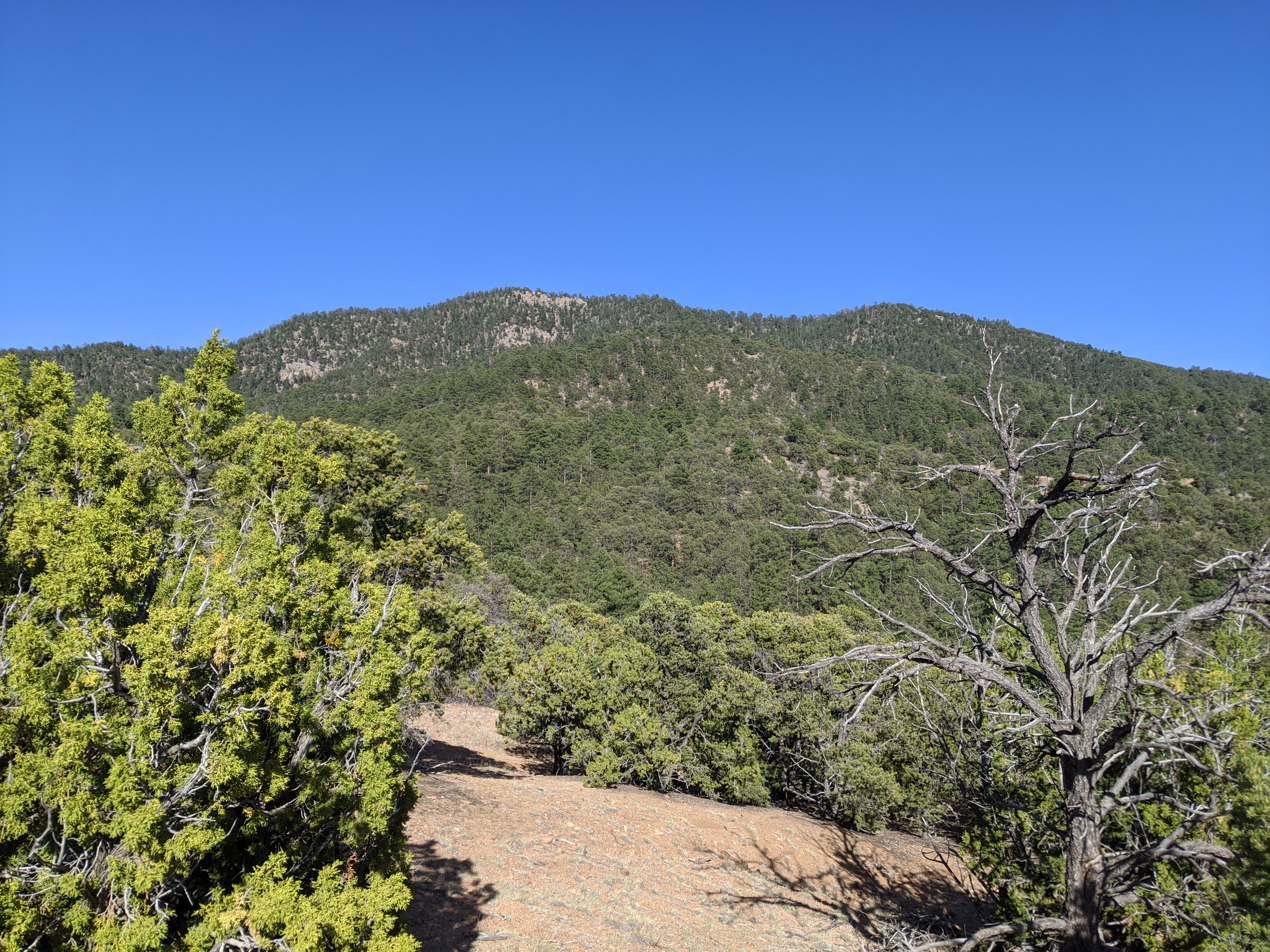
- Atalaya Mountain from Atalaya Trail

Highest point
- Elevation: 9,125 ft (2,781 m) NAVD 88
- Prominence: 721 ft (220 m)
- Coordinates: 35°40′04″N 105°52′35″W

Geography
- Location: Santa Fe County, New Mexico, U.S.
- Parent range: Santa Fe Mountains; Sangre de Cristo Range; Southern Rocky Mountains
- Topo map: USGS Santa Fe

Climbing
- Easiest route: trail hike

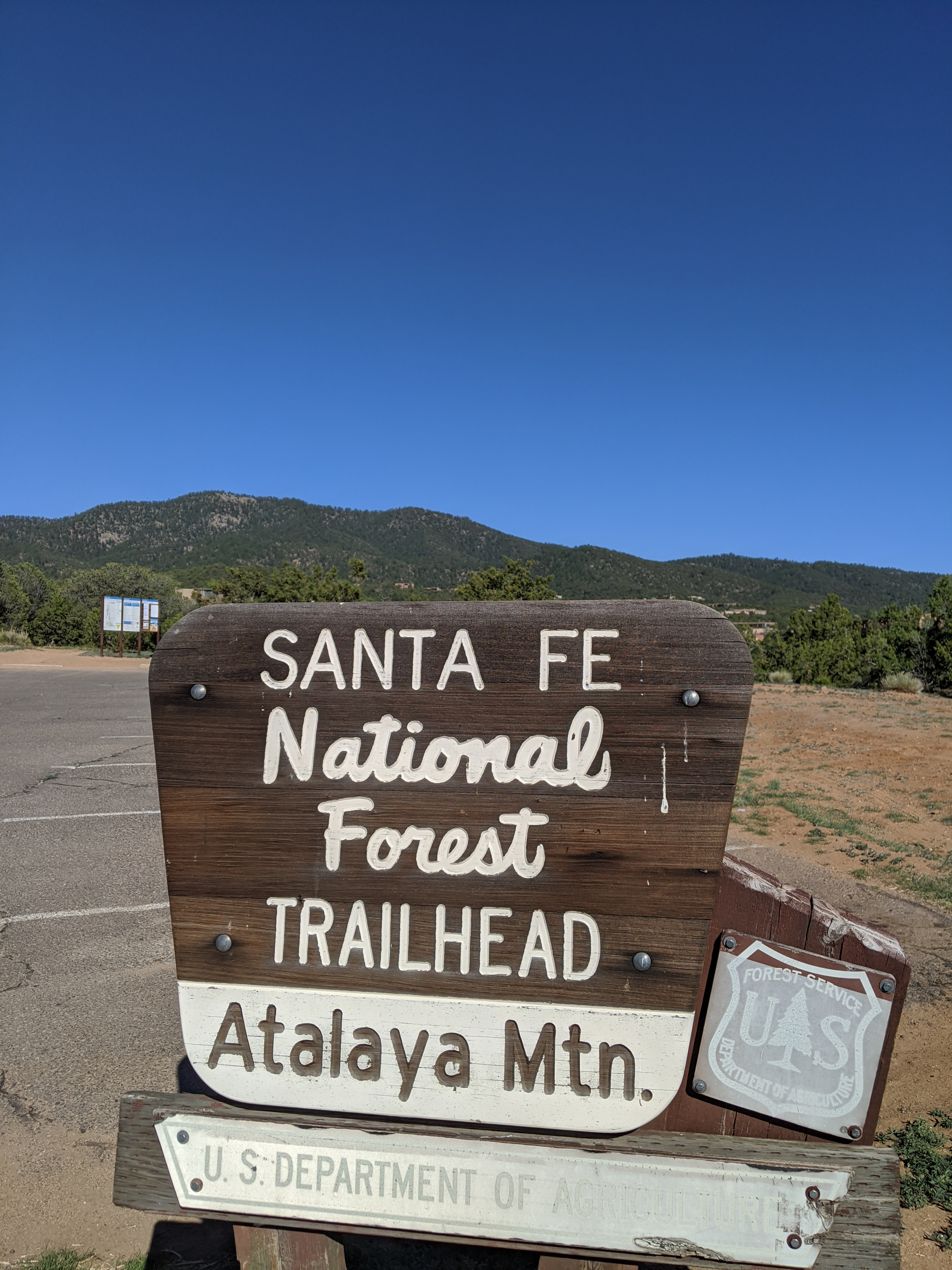
Trailhead sign

Atalaya Mountain is a mountain peak located within the Santa Fe National Forest, in northern New Mexico, United States. It is part of the Santa Fe Mountains in the Sangre de Cristo Range, a subrange of the Southern Rocky Mountains. A relevant viewscape from the city of Santa Fe, there are no higher peaks between the city and Atalaya Mountain to the east. Viewed from the city, Atalaya Mountain is framed by Sun Mountain to the right (south), Picacho Peak to the left (north), and Thompson Peak behind it. Atalaya Mountain is accessible by following the Atalaya Trail, or via the Dale Ball Trails from the direction of Picacho Peak and trail marker number 36.

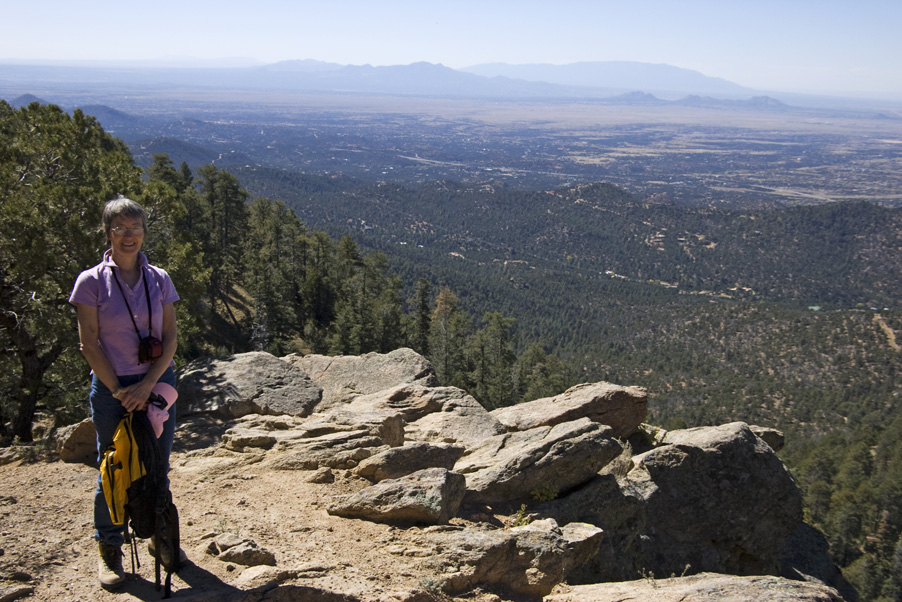
View from Atalaya

== Name ==
Atalaya is a Spanish term meaning watchtower, derived from Arabic and Persian words for a watchman. Variant names include Cerro Atalaya, and Cerro de la Atalaya. Tewa-language names include Ogá Pʼoegeh Pʼin or simply Pʼoegeh Pʼin (Note: pronounced [(ʔòɡɑ́) pʼòːɡè pʼìŋ]), which translates roughly to "mountain near the (white shell) water place", referring to Santa Fe.
