= Hidalgo County Courthouse (New Mexico) =

- U.S. National Register of Historic Places
- NM State Register of Cultural Properties
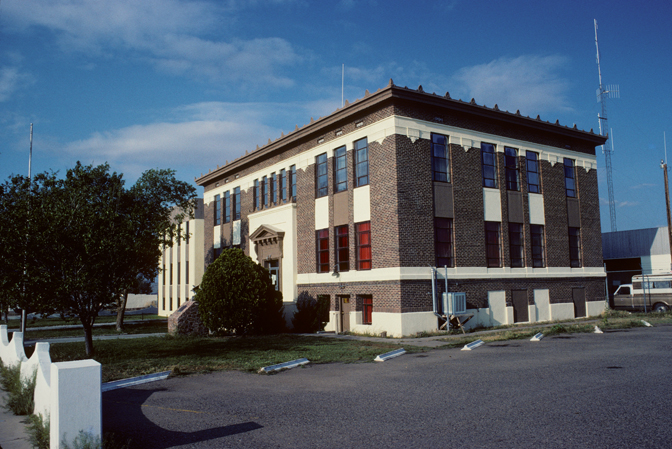

- Location within New Mexico Location within the United States
- Interactive map showing the location of Hidalgo County Courthouse
- Location: 300 S. Shakespeare St., Lordsburg, New Mexico
- Coordinates: 32°20′52″N 108°42′26″W
- Area: 1.5 acres (0.61 ha)
- Built: 1926
- Built by: Heather, Jack
- Architect: Thorman & Frazier
- Architectural style: Neoclassical
- MPS: County Courthouses of New Mexico TR
- NRHP reference No.: 87000897
- NMSRCP No.: 1269

Significant dates
- Added to NRHP: December 7, 1987
- Designated NMSRCP: May 9, 1986

The Hidalgo County Courthouse, located at 300 S. Shakespeare St. in Lordsburg, is the county courthouse serving Hidalgo County, New Mexico. The two-story Neoclassical building, designed by architects Thorman & Frazier, was constructed in 1926. The red brick building features concrete spandrels between the first- and second-story windows and a concrete band at the top of the second-story windows. The entrance is topped by a classical pediment and flanked by pilasters with floral medallions. A metal cornice and crested parapet wrap around the building's roof line.

The courthouse was added to the National Register of Historic Places on December 7, 1987.

== See also ==
- National Register of Historic Places listings in Hidalgo County, New Mexico
