= Lordville =

Lordville may refer to:

- Lordville, Minnesota, an unincorporated community in Lowville Township, Minnesota, US
- Lordville, New York, a hamlet in Hancock Township, New York, US
- Lordville–Equinunk Bridge or Lordville Suspension Bridge, a bridge over the Delaware River

== See also ==
- Lordstown (disambiguation)
- Lordsburg (disambiguation)
