= Archeological Site No. LA 54042 =

- U.S. National Register of Historic Places
- NM State Register of Cultural Properties
- Nearest city: Animas, New Mexico
- Area: 1.9 acres (0.77 ha)
- MPS: Animas Phase Sites in Hidalgo County MPS
- NRHP reference No.: 92001811
- NMSRCP No.: 1324

Significant dates
- Added to NRHP: January 23, 1993
- Designated NMSRCP: October 24, 1986

Archeological Site No. LA 54042 is a prehistoric archaeological site in Hidalgo County, New Mexico. The site was inhabited during the Animas phase (1200-1350 A.D.); some artifacts may also date from the Salado phase (1350-1450 A.D.) A small adobe structure with one to three rooms sits on the east side of the site; it is surrounded by scattered cobbles and ceramics. The structure's small size suggests that it was used as some sort of temporary building, possibly as a field house. The remainder of the site consists of dispersed lithic shards with a relatively low density.

The site was added to the National Register of Historic Places on January 23, 1993.

== See also ==
- National Register of Historic Places in Hidalgo County, New Mexico
