= Box Canyon (Doña Ana County, New Mexico) =

Canyon in New Mexico, United States

Box Canyon, originally known as Picacho Pass, is a canyon in Doña Ana County, New Mexico. Its mouth lies at an elevation of 3,927 feet (1,197 m). Its source is at 32°20′3″N 106°56′31″W.

== History ==
Box Canyon, was known as Pecatch Pass, to Waterman L. Ormsby, who traveled westward through it on the first westbound stage of the Butterfield Overland Mail. This was a mistake of Picacho Pass, the name derived from the Picacho Mountain nearby to the south of the canyon as was the village of Picacho where Ormsby's coach changed horses at the Picacho Stage Station just south of the mouth of the canyon.

Ormsby described the pass:

"Our road lay through what was called the Pecatch [Picacho] Pass, and, I walked nearly all the way through it, it seemed to me rather mountainous. It was about two miles long and had some very bad hills. In comparison with other passes and cañons on the route, it was not very bad, though quite bad enough and all up hill. When however we reached the summit, we were upon the border of a broad and level plain extending as far away as the eye could reach. At our backs were the ranges of the Oregan [Organ] Mountains, the debris of the Rocky Mountains, forming the eastern boundary. Off in the distance Cooke's Peak, rising from the plain in bold prominence from among the surrounding hills."
