= Hidalgo (surname) =

Hidalgo is a Spanish surname. Notable people with the surname include:

- Anne Hidalgo (born 1959), mayor of Paris
- Bartolomé Hidalgo (1788–1822), Uruguayan writer and poet
- Carlos Daniel Hidalgo (born 1986), Colombian football player
- César Hidalgo (born 1979), Chilean-Spanish-American physicist, author, and entrepreneur
- David Hidalgo (born 1954), U.S. musician
- David Hidalgo Jr. (born 1977), U.S. drummer, son of David Hidalgo
- Diane Hidalgo, Miss Belgium 1959, competed in Miss World 1959
- Diego Hidalgo Schnur (born 1942), Spanish philanthropist, intellectual and businessman
- Diego Hidalgo y Durán (1886–1961), Spanish lawyer and politician, father of Diego Hidalgo Schnur
- Duda Hidalgo (born 1999), Brazilian politician
- Elvira de Hidalgo (1891–1980), Spanish soprano singer
- Félix Resurrección Hidalgo (1855–1913), Filipino painter
- Giovanni Hidalgo (born 1963), Puerto Rican musician
- Hannah Hidalgo (born 2005), American basketball player
- Heliodoro Hidalgo (1881–?), Cuban baseball player
- Juan Hidalgo Codorniu (1927–2018), Spanish contemporary composer
- Juan Hidalgo de Polanco (1614–1685), Spanish composer and harpist
- Juan S.P. Hidalgo Jr. (1936–2020), Filipino writer and painter
- Lina Hidalgo (born 1991), Colombian-American politician
- Michel Hidalgo (1933–2020), Former French football player and manager
- Miguel Hidalgo y Costilla (1753–1811), leader of the Mexican independence movement
- Miguel Molina Hidalgo (born 1993), Spanish football coach
- Montserrat Hidalgo (born 1968), Costa Rican breaststroke swimmer
- Nico Hidalgo (1992–2025), Spanish footballer
- Nieves Hidalgo (born 1976), Spanish singer
- Oscar Hidalgo (born 1982), Mexican racing driver
- Pedro Hidalgo (1936–2025), Chilean politician
- Pilar Hidalgo-Lim (1893–1973), Filipino educator and civic leader
- Richard Hidalgo (born 1975), Venezuelan MLB player
- Rubén Ramírez Hidalgo (born 1978), Spanish tennis player
- Sam Hidalgo-Clyne (born 1993), Scottish rugby union player

== See also ==
- Hidalgo (disambiguation)
