= Hidalgo County =

Hidalgo County is the name of two counties in the United States:

- Hidalgo County, New Mexico
- Hidalgo County, Texas

== See also ==
- Lordsburg–Hidalgo County (disambiguation)
- Hidalgo (disambiguation)
