= Dale Ball Trails =

Hiking trail system

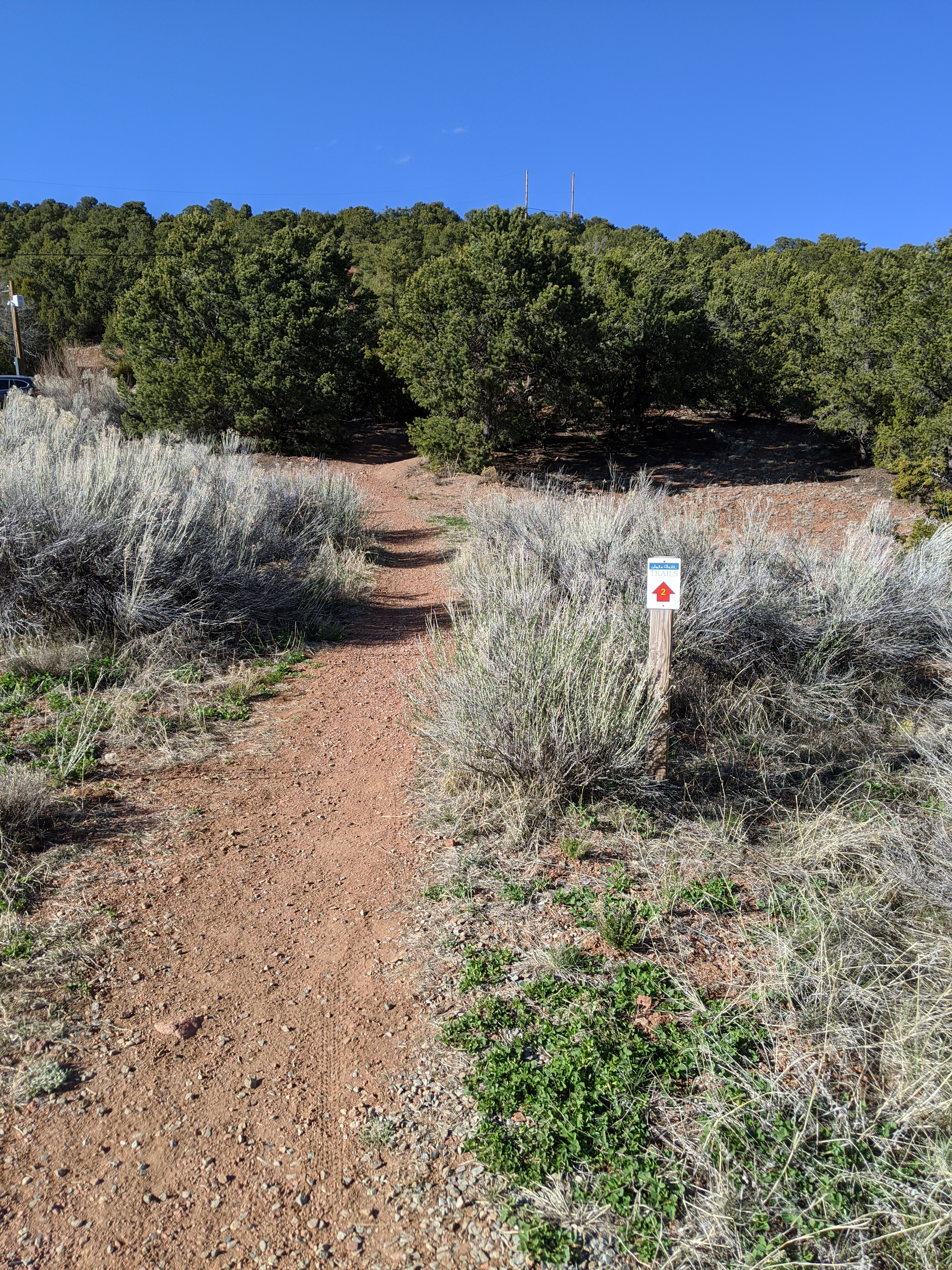
- Length: 24.4 miles (39.3 km)
- Location: Santa Fe, New Mexico, United States
- Established: July 2001
- Trailheads: Sierra del Norte, Cerro Gordo
- Use: Hiking, Trail running, Mountain Biking
- Season: All year
- Hazards: Dehydration, High Desert Weather
- Surface: natural

The Dale Ball Trail system is located at the foothills of the Sangre de Cristo Mountains, outside Santa Fe, New Mexico. A popular destination for hiking, trail running, and mountain biking, these trails vary in difficulty. Sections can be challenging for users not acclimatized to the altitude or climate. The trail system is well marked, junctions include section maps and arrows to nearby junctions.

== Trailheads and access ==
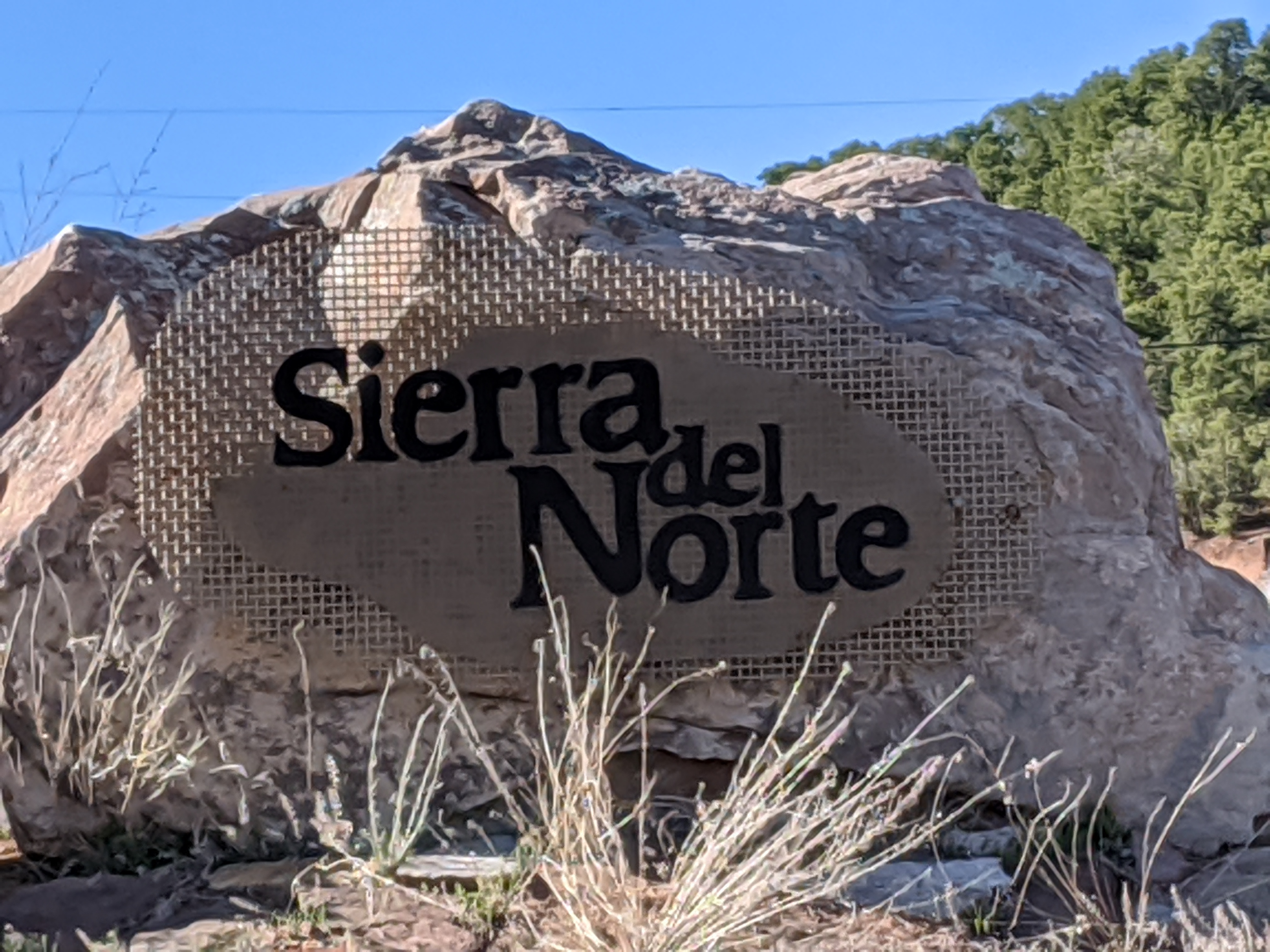
Sierra del Norte trailhead sign

Access to the Dale Ball trail system can be made via dedicated trailheads or adjoining trails. The Cerro Gordo trailhead is located at the intersection of Upper Canyon and Cerro Gordo road. It has limited parking, and gives direct access to the Central and South Sections as well as the Nature Conservancy’s Santa Fe Canyon Preserve Trail. The Sierra del Norte trailhead is located at the intersection of Hyde Park Road and Sierra Del Norte and provides ample parking. This trailhead serves the North and the Central sections of the trail system. The south section of Dale Ball Trails is also served by the Dorothy Stewart trailhead, Wilderness Gate trailhead, and St. John's trailhead, all three located on Camino de Cruz Blanca. Dale Ball Trails can also be accessed from the Atalaya Trail to the south, and the Little Tesuque Trail via La Piedra Trail to the north.

== Trail information ==
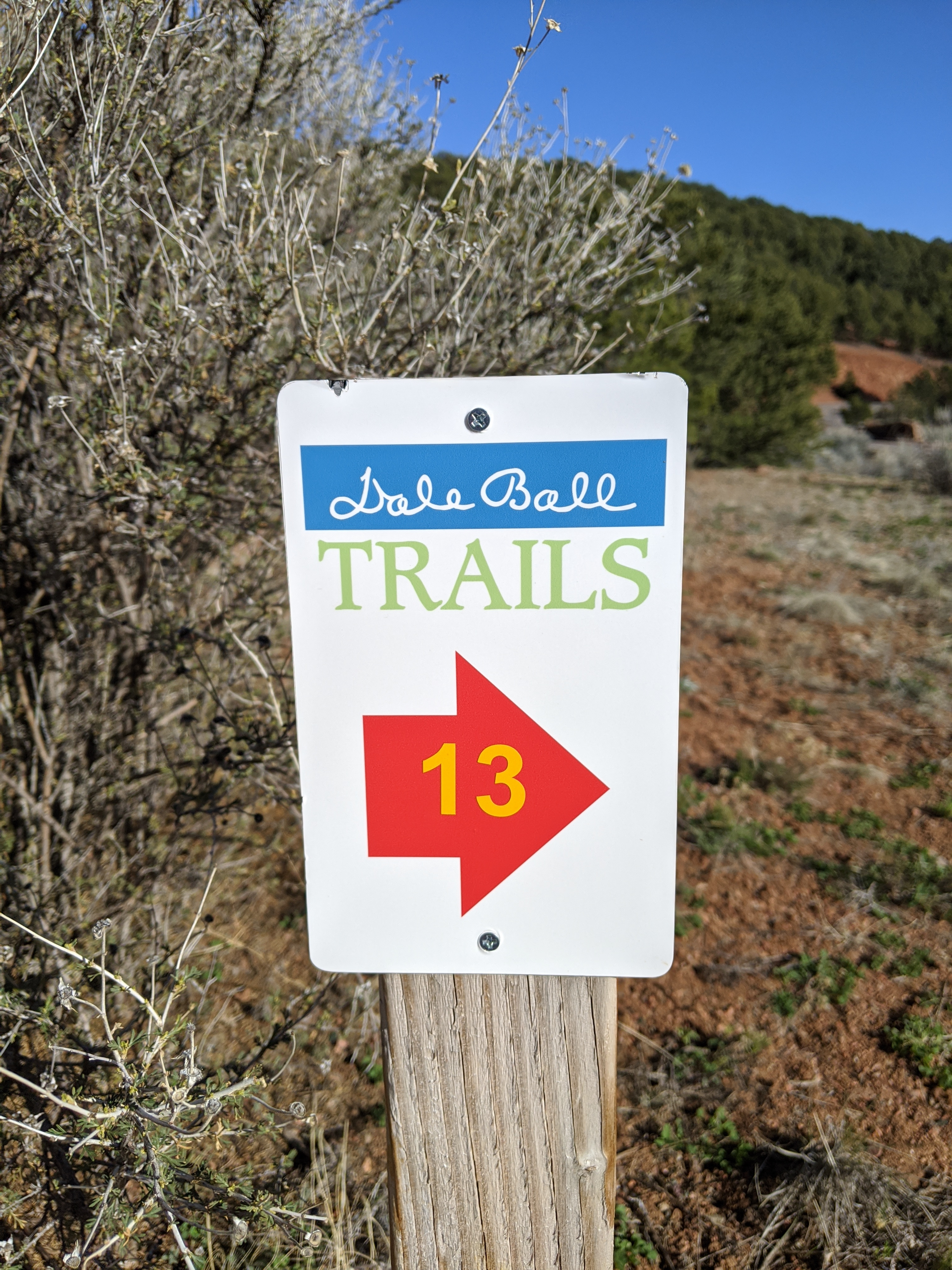
Trail markers

There are maps available for download at the city of Santa Fe website, and paper maps for free at the visitor center at 210 W Marcy Street. The Dale Ball trail system can be broken up into three sections: North, Central and South. The landscape is undulating with juniper, piñon, yucca and cholla cactus on the North and Central section, typical of a pinyon-juniper woodland, while on the south section one can see ponderosa, white fir and douglas fir at higher elevations. The south section can be challenging due to baseline altitude and elevation gain. Picacho Peak (8,577ft) and Atalaya Mountain (9,121ft) are popular destinations on the southern section of the trail system.

== Trail conditions and precautions ==
The baseline elevation at the trailhead, the high desert conditions, and potential elevation gain, warrants some caution from the user. Overall the trail is well maintained and well marked, but connecting trails may not be.

== Events ==
The "Dale Ball Buster", a running event, gained some notoriety due to a Runner's World magazine article written in 2012. The "Ultra Santa Fe", a long distance trail race, and "Frozen Feb FatAss", a nighttime trail run, are events organized by Endurance Santa Fe, which utilize the Dale Ball trail system.
