= Archeological Site No. LA 54021 =

- U.S. National Register of Historic Places
- NM State Register of Cultural Properties
- Nearest city: Animas, New Mexico
- Area: 3.8 acres (1.5 ha)
- MPS: Animas Phase Sites in Hidalgo County MPS
- NRHP reference No.: 92001802
- NMSRCP No.: 1314

Significant dates
- Added to NRHP: January 23, 1993
- Designated NMSRCP: October 24, 1986

Archeological Site No. LA 54021 is a prehistoric archaeological site in Hidalgo County, New Mexico. The site dates from the Animas phase, which spanned from 1200-1350 A.D. Adobe structures with at least 16 total rooms have been found at the site; these structures may represent a transitional phase between pit dwellings and larger Animas compounds. Six of these rooms are filled in with soil and retain their cobble foundations and parts of their adobe walls. The site also includes ceramic remains and some stone artifacts.

The site was added to the National Register of Historic Places on January 23, 1993.

== See also ==
- National Register of Historic Places listings in Hidalgo County, New Mexico
