= Lordstown (disambiguation) =

Lordstown is a city in Ohio, US.

Lordstown may also refer to:

- Lordstown Assembly or Lordstown, an auto assembly plant in Lordstown, Ohio
- Lordstown Cluster, a rail division centered around Lordstown, Ohio
- Lordstown High School, a high school in Lordstown, Ohio
- Lordstown Motors, an electric vehicle manufacturer division of Workhorse Group

== See also ==
- Lordville (disambiguation)
- Lordsburg (disambiguation)
