= Alamo Hueco Site =

- U.S. National Register of Historic Places
- NM State Register of Cultural Properties
- Nearest city: Animas, New Mexico
- Area: 40 acres (16 ha)
- MPS: Animas Phase Sites in Hidalgo County MPS
- NRHP reference No.: 92001800
- NMSRCP No.: 1329

Significant dates
- Added to NRHP: January 28, 1993
- Designated NMSRCP: October 24, 1986

The Alamo Hueco Site is a prehistoric archaeological site in Hidalgo County, New Mexico. The site was inhabited from 600 to 1350 A.D., a period which spanned the San Luis phase, the Mimbres phase, and the Animas phase. The inhabitants of the site built several adobe mounds; while the mounds have been extensively vandalized, two large mounds still contain hundreds of rooms and significant cultural deposits. Materials recovered from the site include ceramics, lithic scatters, and cobbles.

The site was added to the National Register of Historic Places on January 28, 1993.

== See also ==
- National Register of Historic Places listings in Hidalgo County, New Mexico
