= Animas High School =

Public school in Animas, New Mexico

Location
- 1 Panther Boulevard; Animas, New Mexico
- 31°56′59″N 108°48′43″W

Information
- Grades: 7–12
- Enrollment: 90
- Website: www.animask12.net

Animas High School is a public high school in Animas, New Mexico. As of the 2024–25 school year, Animas High School had 90 students in attendance, having students grades 7–12.

It also works in association with Western New Mexico University.

== History ==
In 2025, a student was arrested at Animas High School for bringing a firearm onto school premises, though it was believed by authorities that the student had no violent intent.

== Sports ==
When Animas played 11-man football, the school became one of the strongest dynasties in New Mexico sports history. Starting in the 1984 season, Elida would go on a 72 game unbeaten streak that would last until 1990. After a draw against Tularosa High School in the 1984 championship, they also achieved a 69 game win steak.

Animas' streak was the second longest in American high school football history, and received significant regional support and interest, even receiving coverage by Life magazine.

Animas currently plays in 6-man football. They most recently won the state championship in 2018 against Elida High School.
