= Archeological Site No. LA 54050 =

- U.S. National Register of Historic Places
- NM State Register of Cultural Properties
- Nearest city: Animas, New Mexico
- Area: 5.5 acres (2.2 ha)
- MPS: Animas Phase Sites in Hidalgo County MPS
- NRHP reference No.: 92001814
- NMSRCP No.: 1327

Significant dates
- Added to NRHP: January 23, 1993
- Designated NMSRCP: October 24, 1986

Archeological Site No. LA 54050 is a prehistoric archaeological site in Hidalgo County, New Mexico. The Animas phase site was inhabited from roughly 1200 to 1350 A.D. Its principal feature is a 1-metre (3 ft 3 in) tall adobe mound with about 50 rooms. Another adobe block to the south of the main mound may contain another 50 rooms, though it has not been fully investigated. A lithic scatter is located to the west of the main site. Artifacts recovered from the site include ceramics, cobbles, and projectile points.

The site was added to the National Register of Historic Places on January 23, 1993.

== See also ==
- National Register of Historic Places listings in Hidalgo County, New Mexico
