= Archeological Site No. LA 54049 =

- U.S. National Register of Historic Places
- NM State Register of Cultural Properties
- Nearest city: Animas, New Mexico
- Area: 49.4 acres (20.0 ha)
- MPS: Animas Phase Sites in Hidalgo County MPS
- NRHP reference No.: 92001813
- NMSRCP No.: 1326

Significant dates
- Added to NRHP: January 23, 1993
- Designated NMSRCP: October 24, 1986

Archeological Site No. LA 54049 is a prehistoric archaeological site in Hidalgo County, New Mexico. The site was inhabited during the Animas phase (1200-1350 A.D.); it may have also had a Mimbres phase occupation in 1000-1150 A.D. The site's most distinctive feature consists of two stone lines, each roughly 30 metres (98 ft) long and separated by a 29-metre (95 ft) gap. While the purpose of the lines is uncertain, they may have demarcated a court for some sort of ball game. The site also includes a large lithic scatter and numerous ceramic fragments.

The site was added to the National Register of Historic Places on January 23, 1993.

== See also ==
- National Register of Historic Places listings in Hidalgo County, New Mexico
