= Atalaya Trail =

Hiking trail in Santa Fe, New Mexico, USA

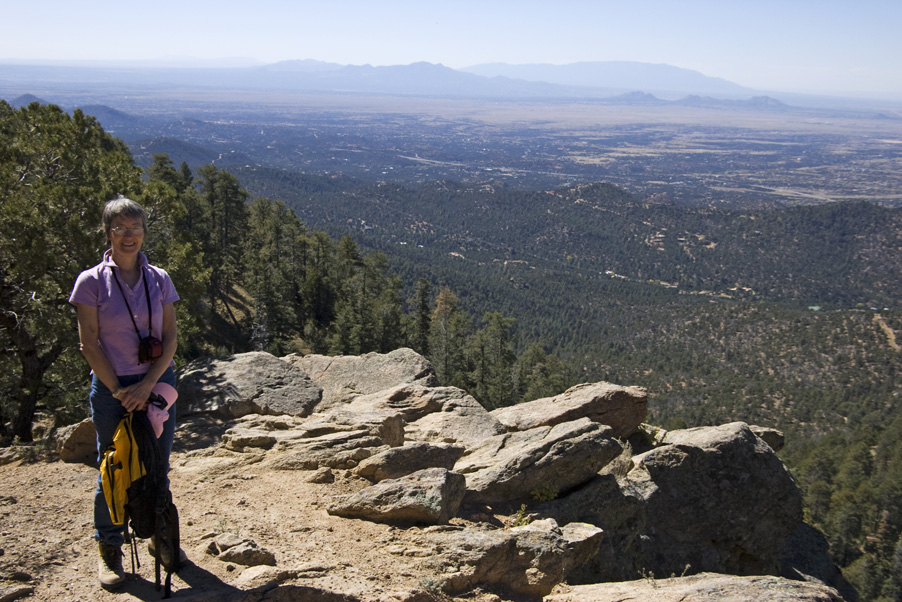
- View from top of Atalaya Mountain
- Length: 3 miles (5 km) to 5.8 miles (9 km)
- Location: Santa Fe, New Mexico; Santa Fe National Forest; Southern Rocky Mountains
- Trailheads: Saint John's College; Dorothy Stewart; Wilderness Gate
- Use: Hiking; Trail running Mountain biking
- Elevation gain/loss: 1,774 feet (541 m) gain approximately
- Highest point: Atalaya Mountain, 9,125 ft (2,781 m)
- Lowest point: Arroyo de los Chamisos, 7,352.4 ft (2,241.0 m)
- Difficulty: medium to strenuous
- Season: Year-round
- Sights: Sangre de Cristo Range; Santa Fe; Picacho Peak; Thompson Peak
- Hazards: Severe weather Steep grades Dehydration; Snow & Ice (Winter)

The Atalaya Trail is an out and back trail to the summit of Atalaya Mountain, in Santa Fe, New Mexico.

== Distance ==
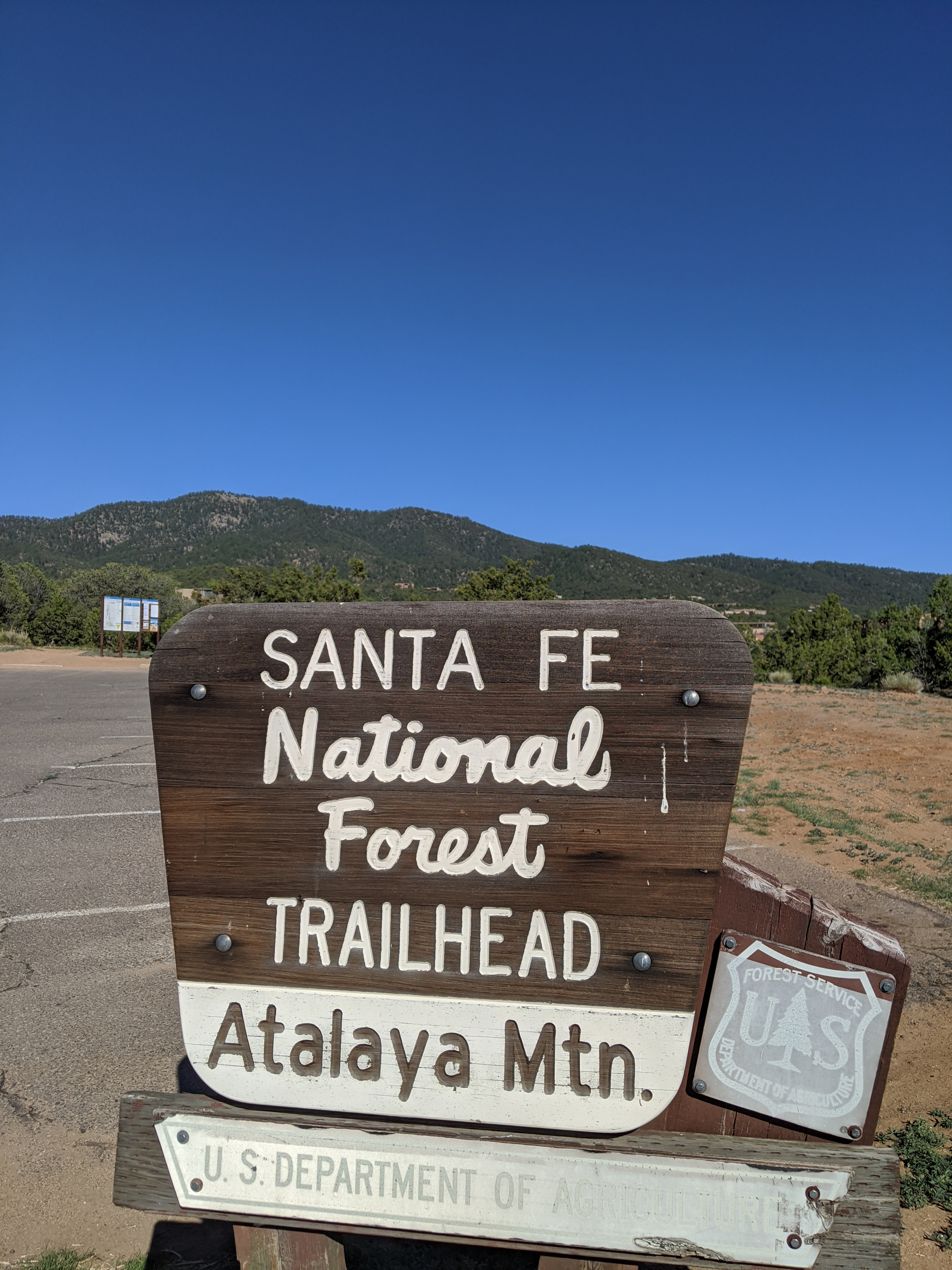
Atalaya Mountain trailhead sign

Some ambiguity in the trail distance can be found in reference material due to the fact that the United States Forest Service trailhead named "Atalaya Mtn." is located on St. John's College, and to reach trail #170 "Atalaya Trail", one typically hikes an extra 1.5 mi (2.4 km) on Trail #174 "St. John's Trail". The total distance from Atalaya Mtn. trailhead to summit is 4.5 mi (7.2 km) to 5.8 mi (9.3 km), with an elevation gain of 1,774 ft (541 m). A second total distance discrepancy arises when the trail branches into trail #172 "Hard Atalaya" as a steeper but shorter route to the summit.

== Route ==
The Atalaya Mountain trailhead (35.668471°N 105.912022°W) is at St. John's College, where there is parking. St. John's Trail (TR 174) follows along the Arroyo de los Chamisos, enters and exits the arroyo to the left and crosses Wilderness Gate Rd., turning into the Atalaya Trail (TR 170). It is also possible to enter the Atalaya Trail from the Dale Ball Trails via two access trails. One from the direction of Picacho Peak directly to the summit of Atalaya Mountain, and another near the Wilderness Gate residential area, west of Wilderness Gate road. The Atalaya Trail branches into Hard Atalaya (TR 172), where a signpost directs hikers straight for "Steeper Route" or right for "Easier Route". Both routes connect higher up the main trail (TR 170). Older trail maps might label the "Easier Route" the "newer bypass", and the "Steeper Route" the "original route, TR 170". Coming back from the summit, one should be careful not to follow a route into the Santa Fe Watershed, a protected area that is off limits to the public. Two trailheads located on Camino de Cruz Blanca allows one to skip hiking most of the Saint Johns trail to access Atalaya Trail, but provide only minimal parking.
