= Hidalgo (moth) =

Scientific classification
- Kingdom: Animalia
- Phylum: Arthropoda
- Clade: Pancrustacea
- Class: Insecta
- Order: Lepidoptera
- Family: Geometridae
- Genus: Hidalgo; Rindge, 1983

Genus of moths

Hidalgo is a genus of moths in the family Geometridae described by Rindge in 1983.

== Species ==
- Hidalgo maidiena Dyar, 1913
- Hidalgo terranea Warren, 1907
