= Lordsburg-Hidalgo County Library =

- Lordsburg--Hidalgo County Library
- U.S. National Register of Historic Places
- NM State Register of Cultural Properties
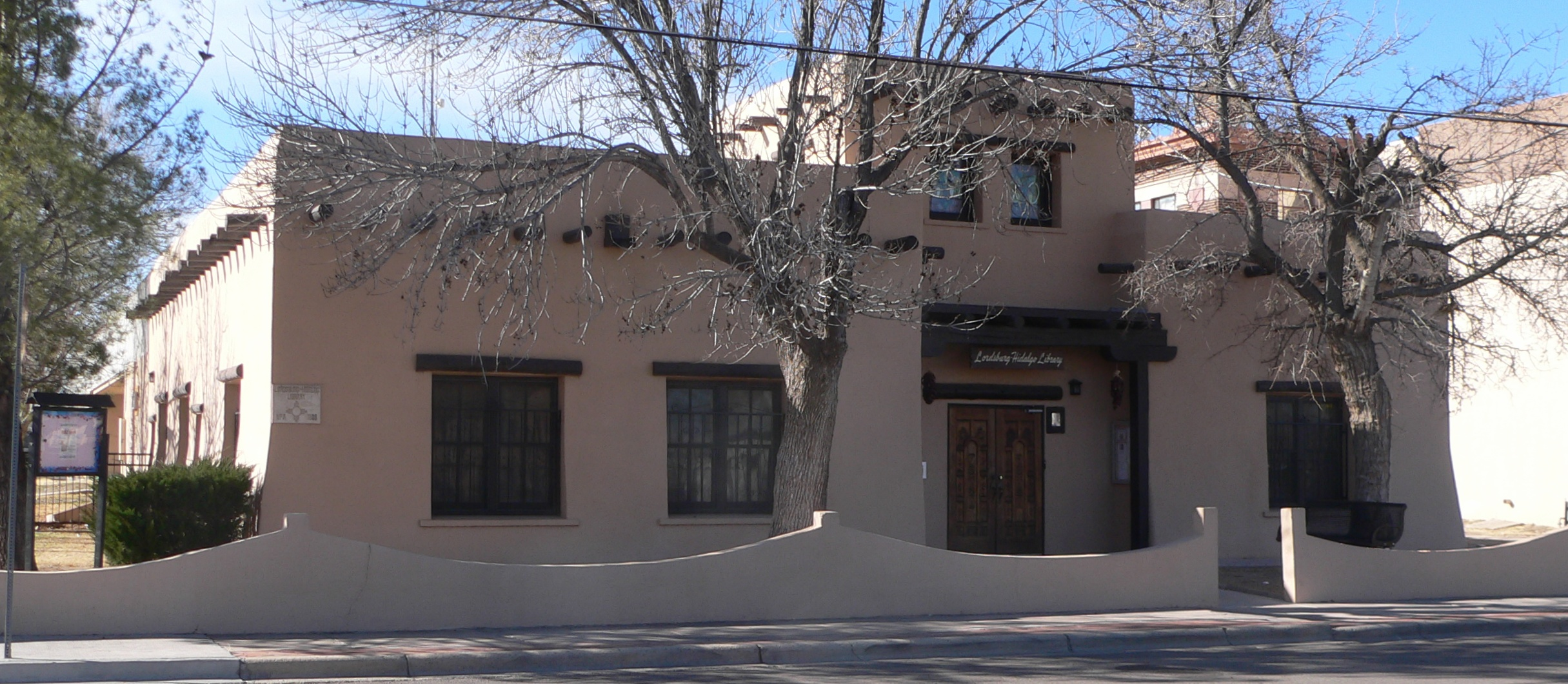

- Location within New Mexico Location within the United States
- Location: 208 E. Third St., Lordsburg, New Mexico
- Coordinates: 32°20′53″N 108°42′28″W
- Area: less than one acre
- Built: 1937
- Architectural style: Pueblo Revival
- MPS: New Deal in New Mexico MPS
- NRHP reference No.: 03001547
- NMSRCP No.: 1856

Significant dates
- Added to NRHP: February 4, 2004
- Designated NMSRCP: October 10, 2003

The Lordsburg-Hidalgo County Library is a public library located at 208 E. Third St. in Lordsburg, New Mexico. The Lordsburg Women's Club established Lordsburg's library in 1919; it originally operated out of spaces in other public buildings and houses. The Works Progress Administration built a permanent building for the library in 1936–37. The library building has a Pueblo Revival design with adobe walls and vigas supporting the roof. A New Deal-commissioned oil painting titled Landscape in Talpa, which was given to the library upon its opening, decorates the inside. The library currently has over 20,000 volumes and is one of two county-funded libraries in New Mexico.

The library was added to the National Register of Historic Places on February 4, 2004.

== See also ==
- National Register of Historic Places listings in Hidalgo County, New Mexico
