= Box Canyon Dam =

Box Canyon Dam may refer to:

- Box Canyon Dam (Washington), in the U.S. State of Washington
- Box Canyon Dam (California), in the U.S. State of California
