= Villa Hidalgo, Baja California =

Villa Hidalgo
- Location in Mexico
- Coordinates: 30°59′N 116°11′W
- Country: Mexico
- State: Baja California

Villa Hidalgo is a village in Baja California, Mexico.

== Climate ==
Climate data for Villa Hidalgo
Month	Jan	Feb	Mar	Apr	May	Jun	Jul	Aug	Sep	Oct	Nov	Dec	Year
Mean daily maximum °C (°F)	21.5 (70.7)	22.9 (73.2)	23.2 (73.8)	25.2 (77.4)	26 (79)	29.5 (85.1)	32.4 (90.3)	33.7 (92.7)	32.4 (90.3)	28.8 (83.8)	25.4 (77.7)	22.4 (72.3)	27.0 (80.6)
Mean daily minimum °C (°F)	3.8 (38.8)	4.4 (39.9)	5.7 (42.3)	7.0 (44.6)	9.1 (48.4)	11 (52)	14.1 (57.4)	14.5 (58.1)	13.4 (56.1)	9.7 (49.5)	5.7 (42.3)	3.6 (38.5)	8.5 (47.3)
Average precipitation mm (inches)	53 (2.1)	64 (2.5)	53 (2.1)	15 (0.6)	2.5 (0.1)	0 (0)	0 (0)	2.5 (0.1)	7.6 (0.3)	10 (0.4)	25 (1)	46 (1.8)	280 (11.1)
Source: Weatherbase
