= Box Canyon Site =

- U.S. National Register of Historic Places
- NM State Register of Cultural Properties
- Nearest city: Animas, New Mexico
- Area: 1.5 acres (0.61 ha)
- MPS: Animas Phase Sites in Hidalgo County MPS
- NRHP reference No.: 92001796
- NMSRCP No.: 1309

Significant dates
- Added to NRHP: January 28, 1993
- Designated NMSRCP: October 24, 1986

The Box Canyon Site is a prehistoric archaeological site in Hidalgo County, New Mexico. The site was occupied during the Animas phase (1200–1350); some artifacts may also date from the Salado phase (1350–1450) The principal feature of the site is an adobe house mound containing more than 100 rooms. A 1962 excavation explored 18 of the rooms; artifacts recovered from the investigation include ceramics, stone and metal flakes, and some cobbles.

The site was added to the National Register of Historic Places on Jan. 28, 1993.

== See also ==
- National Register of Historic Places listings in Hidalgo County, New Mexico
