= Old Lordsburg High School =

- Lordsburg High School
- U.S. National Register of Historic Places
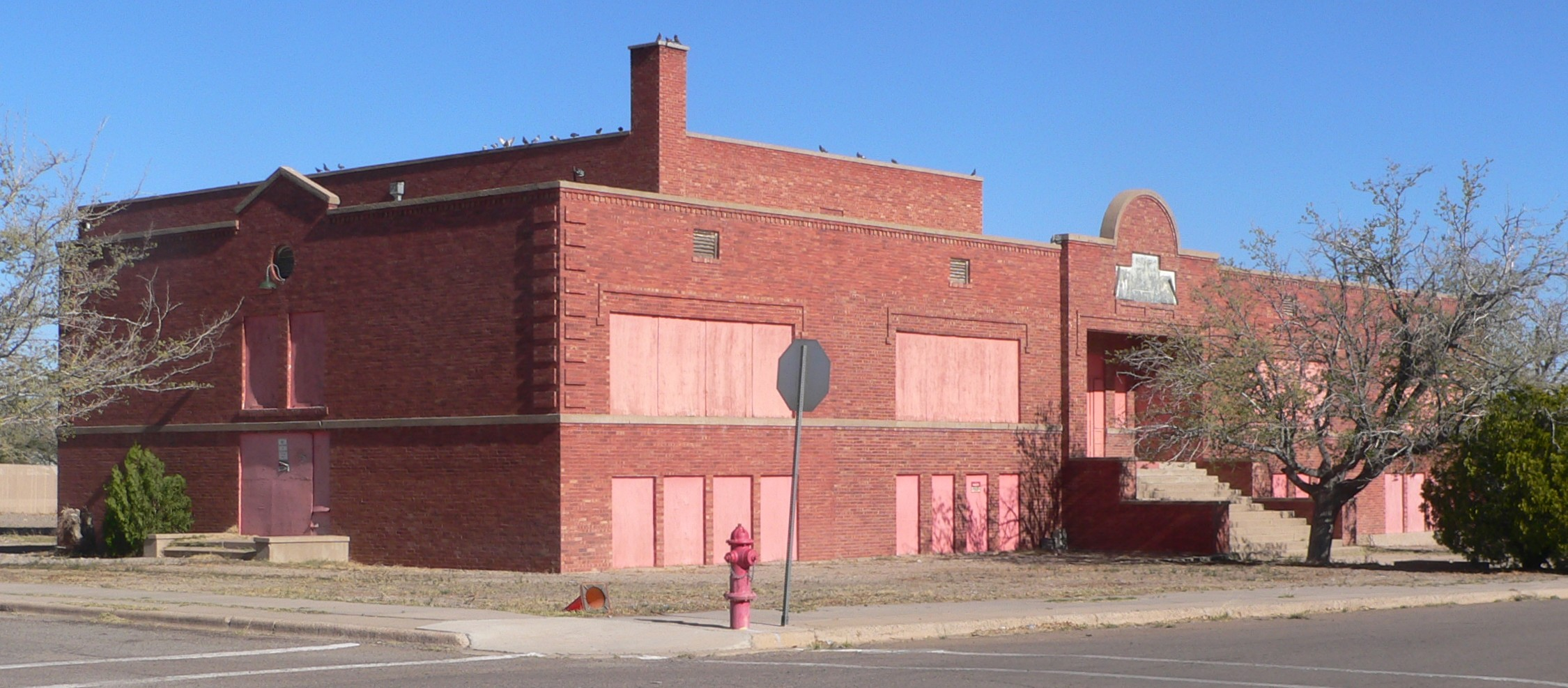

- Location within New Mexico
- Location: 209 Penn St., Lordsburg, New Mexico
- Coordinates: 32°20′59″N 108°42′42″W
- Built: 19
- Architectural style: Pueblo
- NRHP reference No.: 15000606
- Added to NRHP: September 17, 2015

The Lordsburg High School, at 209 Penn St. in Lordsburg, New Mexico, United States, was listed on the National Register of Historic Places in 2015.

It is the old high school building.

Its preservation was a subject of controversy.
