= Picacho Mountain (New Mexico) =

Mountain in New Mexico, United States

Coordinates: 32°19′58″N 106°52′55″W

Picacho Mountain, also known as El Picacho and Picacho Peak, is a summit in Doña Ana County, New Mexico. It rises to an elevation of 4,954 feet / 1,510 meters.

Picacho Mountain as viewed from Picacho Hills.
