= Tucson Mountains =

Landform in Pima County, Arizona

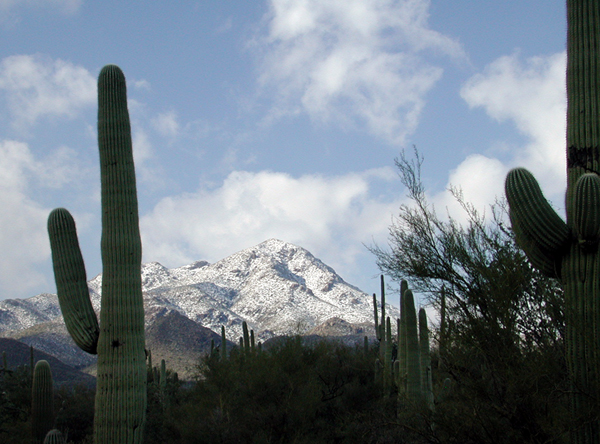
- Wasson Peak is the highest point in the Tucson Mountains. Unlike what this picture shows, snow is extremely rare in these mountains, especially in the amount seen here.

Highest point
- Peak: Wasson Peak
- Elevation: 4,687 ft (1,429 m)
- Coordinates: 32°16.4′N 111°8.8′W

Geography
- Location within Arizona
- Country: United States
- State: Arizona
- Region: Sonoran Desert
- County: Pima
- City: Tucson, Arizona
- Range coordinates: 32°13′30″N 111°7′0″W
- Topo map(s): USGS Cat Mountain, Arizona, Jaynes, Arizona, Avra, Arizona, Brown Mountain, Arizona

The Tucson Mountains (O'odham: Cuk Doʼag) are a minor mountain range west of Tucson, Arizona, United States. The Tucson Mountains, including Wasson Peak, are one of four notable mountain ranges surrounding the Tucson Basin. The Santa Catalina Mountains lie to the northeast, the Rincon Mountains are to the east of Tucson, and the Santa Rita Mountains lie to the south. Additionally, the Sierrita Mountains lie due south, the Roskruge Mountains lie to the west across Avra Valley, the Silver Bell Mountains lie to the northwest, and the Tortolita Mountains lie to the north across the Santa Cruz Valley.

== Parks and preserves ==
The Arizona-Sonora Desert Museum is located on the west flank of the Tucson Mountains. Much of the range is protected by Saguaro National Park and Tucson Mountain Park, run by Pima County. Old Tucson Studios are located just west of the Tucson Mountains.

Tucson Mountain Park was established in April 1929. The Pima County Parks Commission, with C. B. Brown as its chairman, was established to oversee the park. At approximately 20,000 acres (8,100 ha), the park is one of the largest natural resource areas owned and managed by a local government in the U.S. The park has approximately 62 miles (100 km) of non-motorized shared-use trails. The area is popular with hikers, mountain bikers, and equestrians.

Saguaro National Park was created as a national monument in 1933 and later designated a national park in 1994. The Tucson Mountain District of Saguaro National Park ranges from an elevation of 2,180 to 4,687 ft (664 to 1,429 m) and contains 2 biotic communities, desert scrub, and desert grassland. Average annual precipitation is approximately 10.27 in (26.1 cm). Common wildlife include the coyote, Gambel's quail, and desert tortoise.

Brown Mountain in Tucson Mountain Park is named in honor of park founder, C.B. Brown; Kinney Road, the main thoroughfare in the park is, named for Pima County Supervisor, Jack C. Kinney who worked with Brown in the creation of the park and McCain Loop was named for J.C. McCain, the first park ranger.

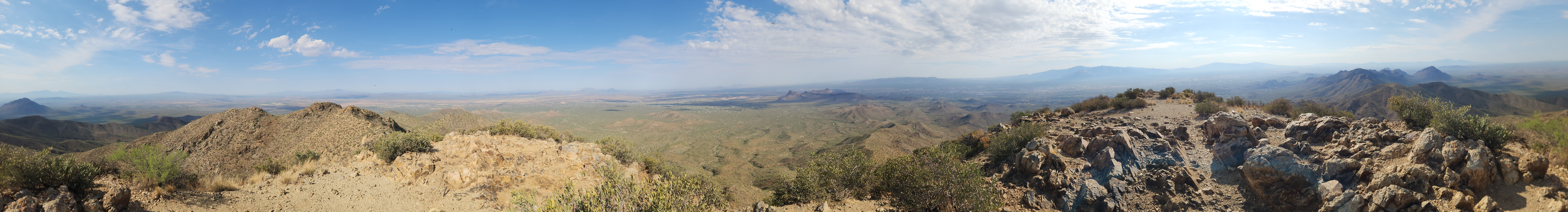
Wasson Peak in August 2025

== Gallery ==
Tucson Mountains and saguaro from the Brown Mountain Trail

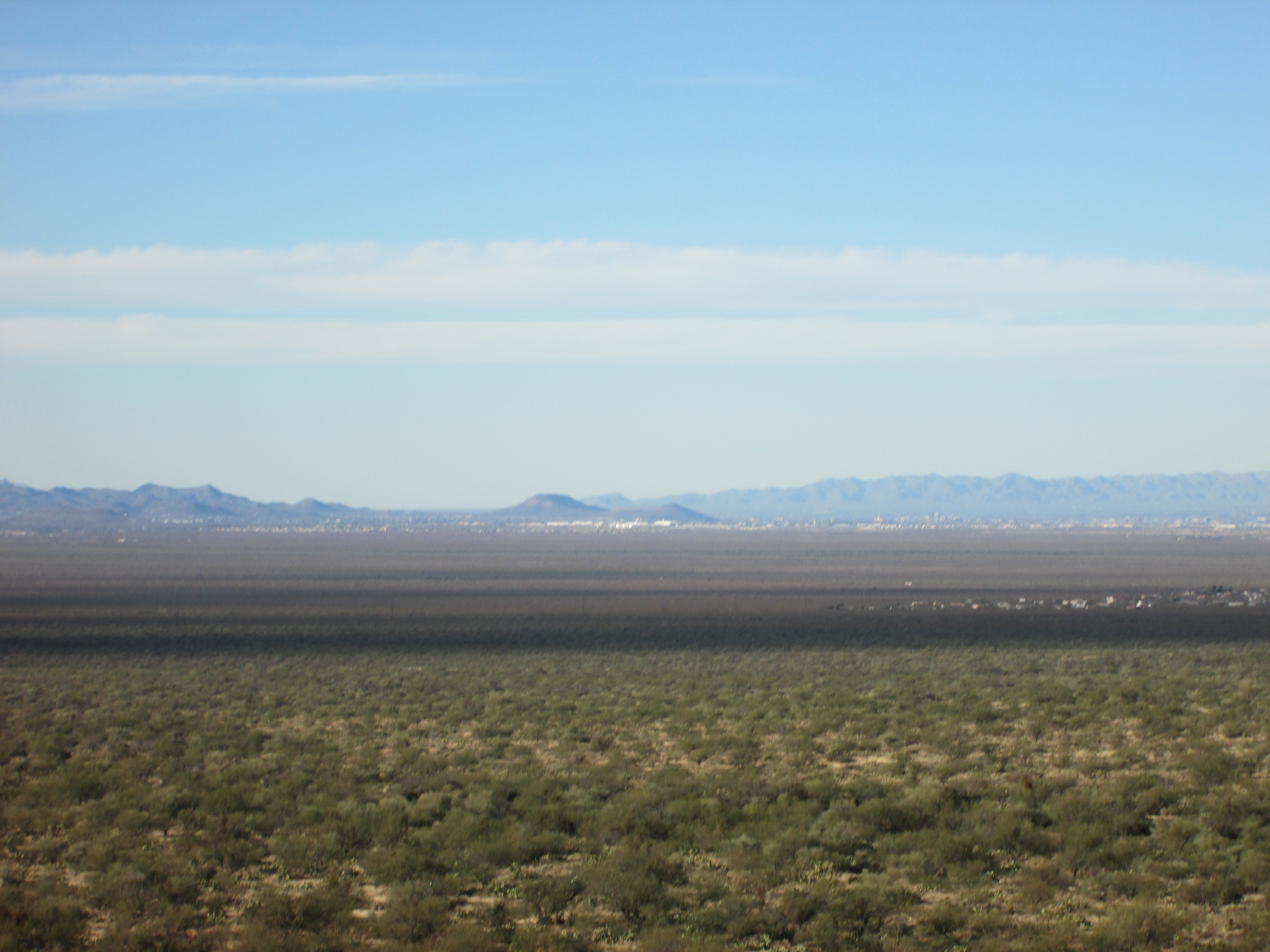
View across the Tucson Basin towards Tumamoc Hill (left) and "A" Mountain (right), which can be seen in the center of the background.

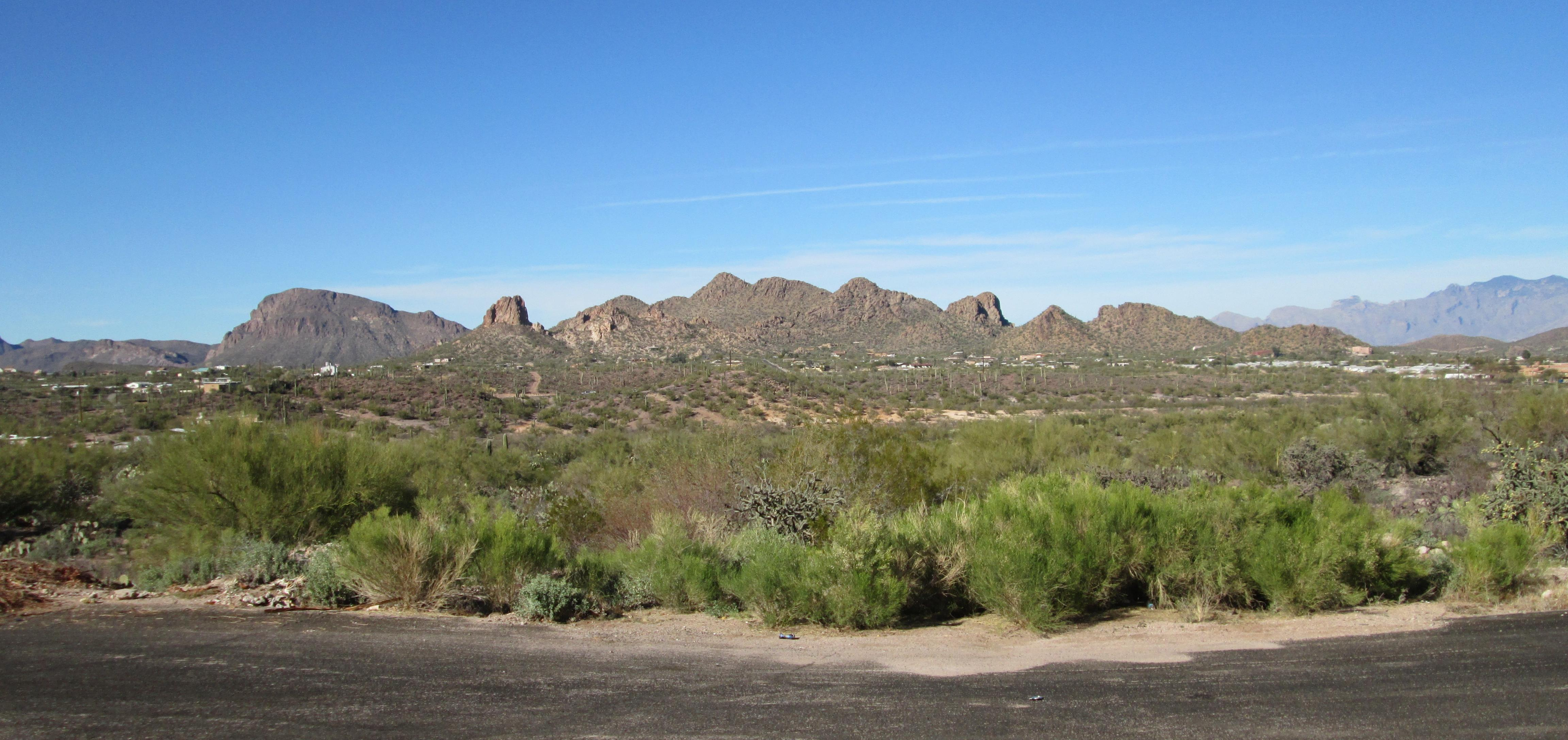
The foothills south of the Tucson Mountains. Beehive Peak is at the center-left, Cat Mountain is at the far left. The Catalina Mountains are in the background at right.

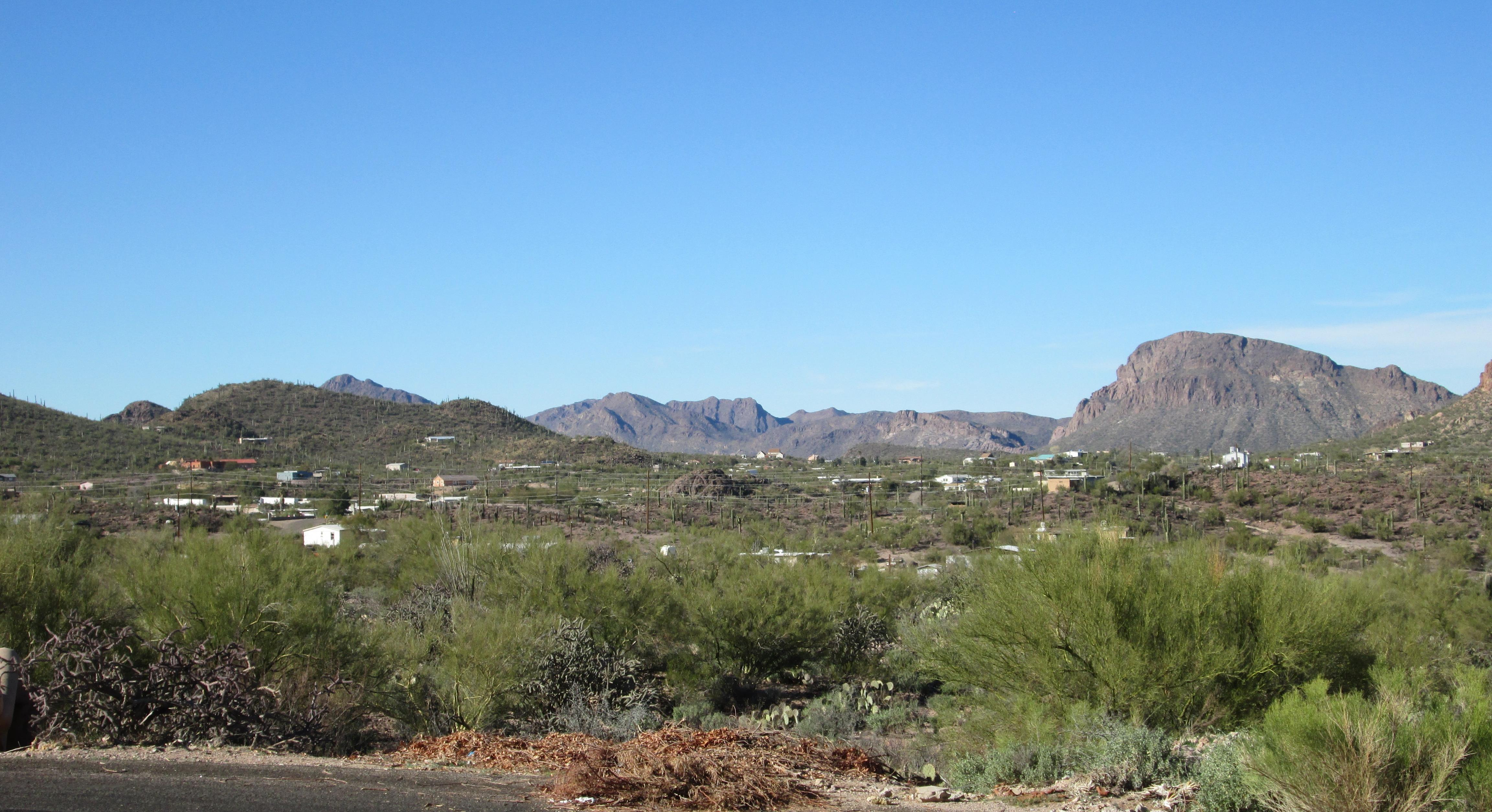
Another view of the foothills south of the Tucson Mountains. Cat Mountain is at the right.

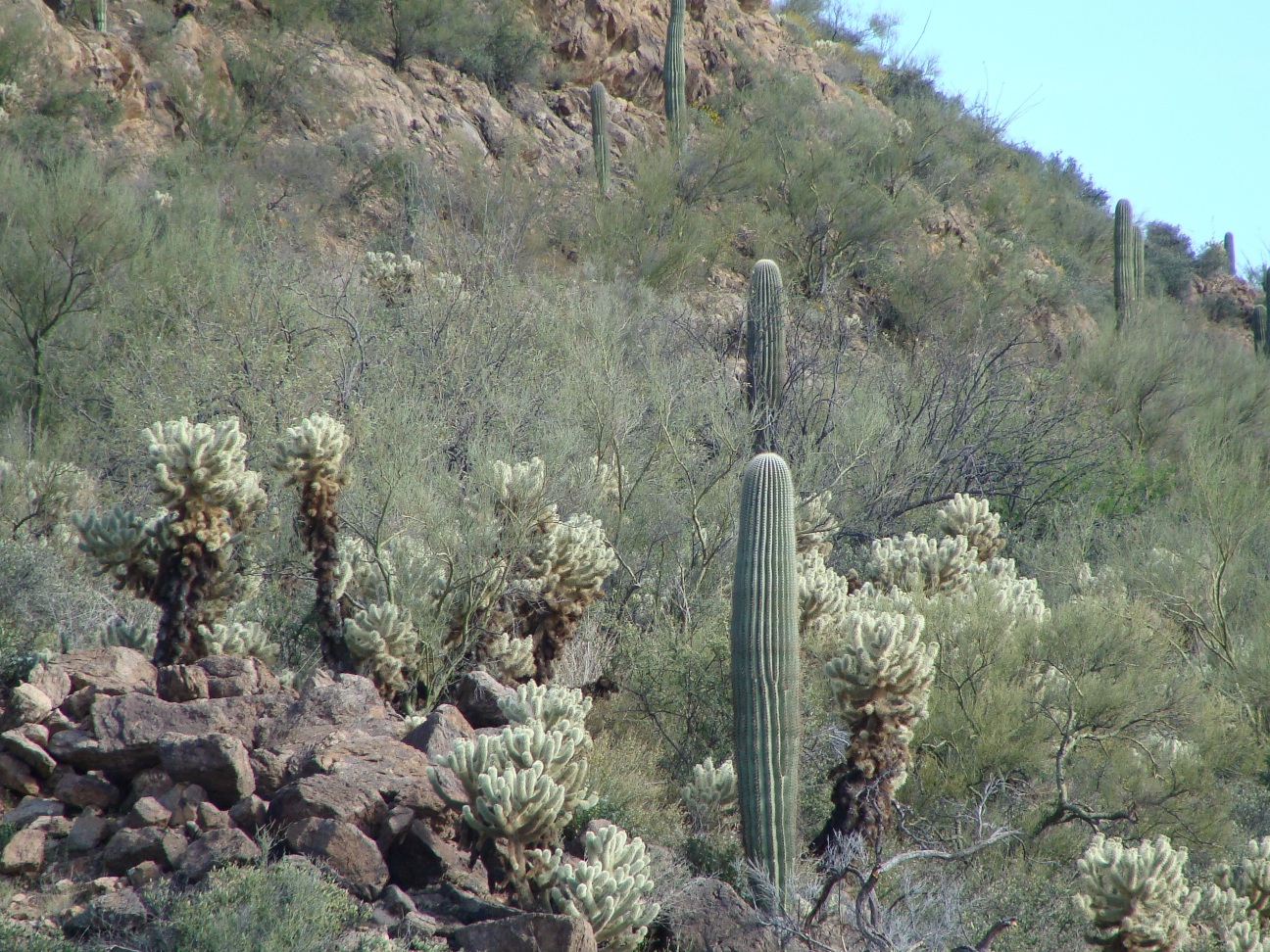
Sonoran Desert vegetation at Gates Pass.

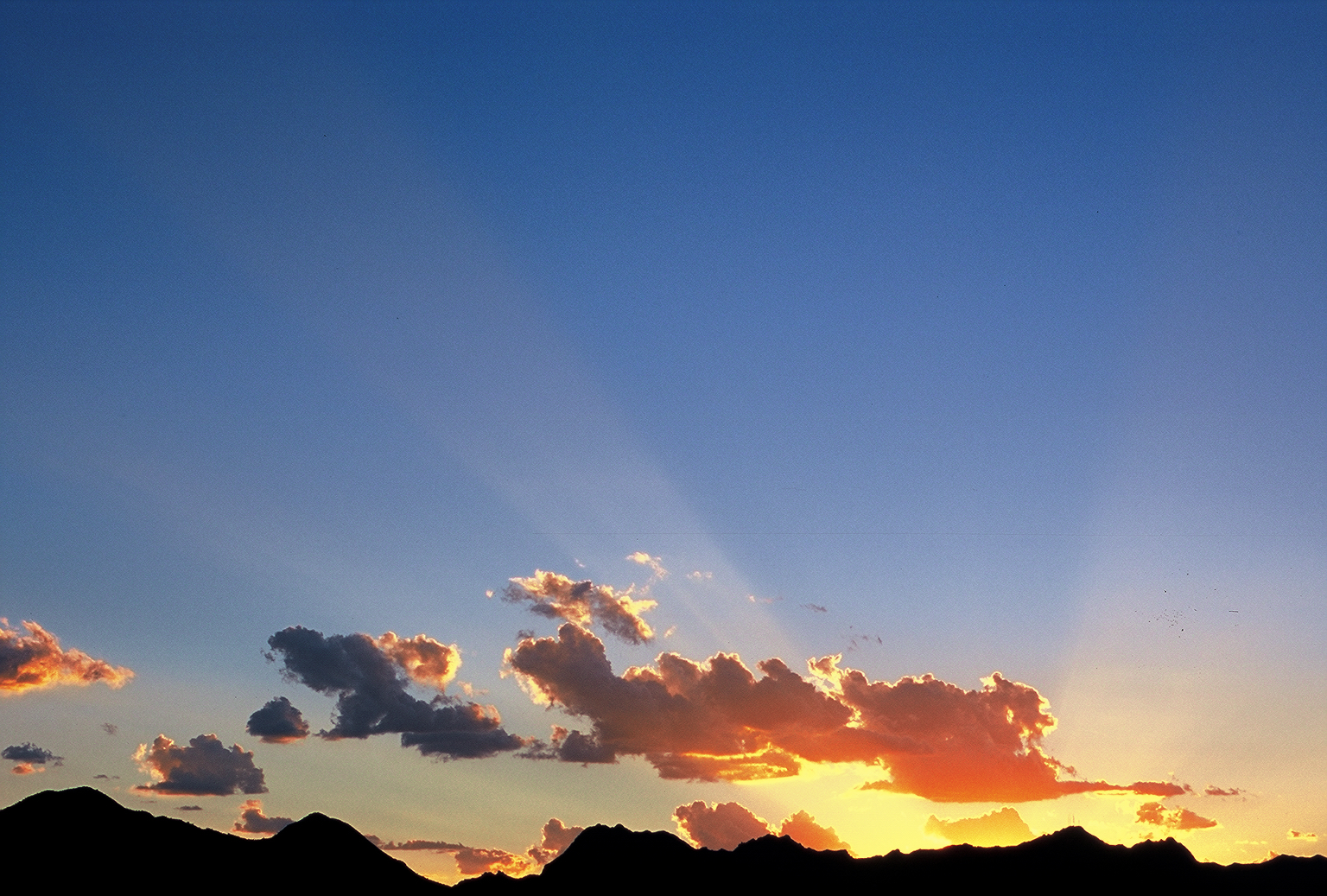
Sunset over the Tucson Mountains.

== See also ==
- Madrean Sky Islands
