= Waterman Mountains =

Landform in Pima County, Arizona

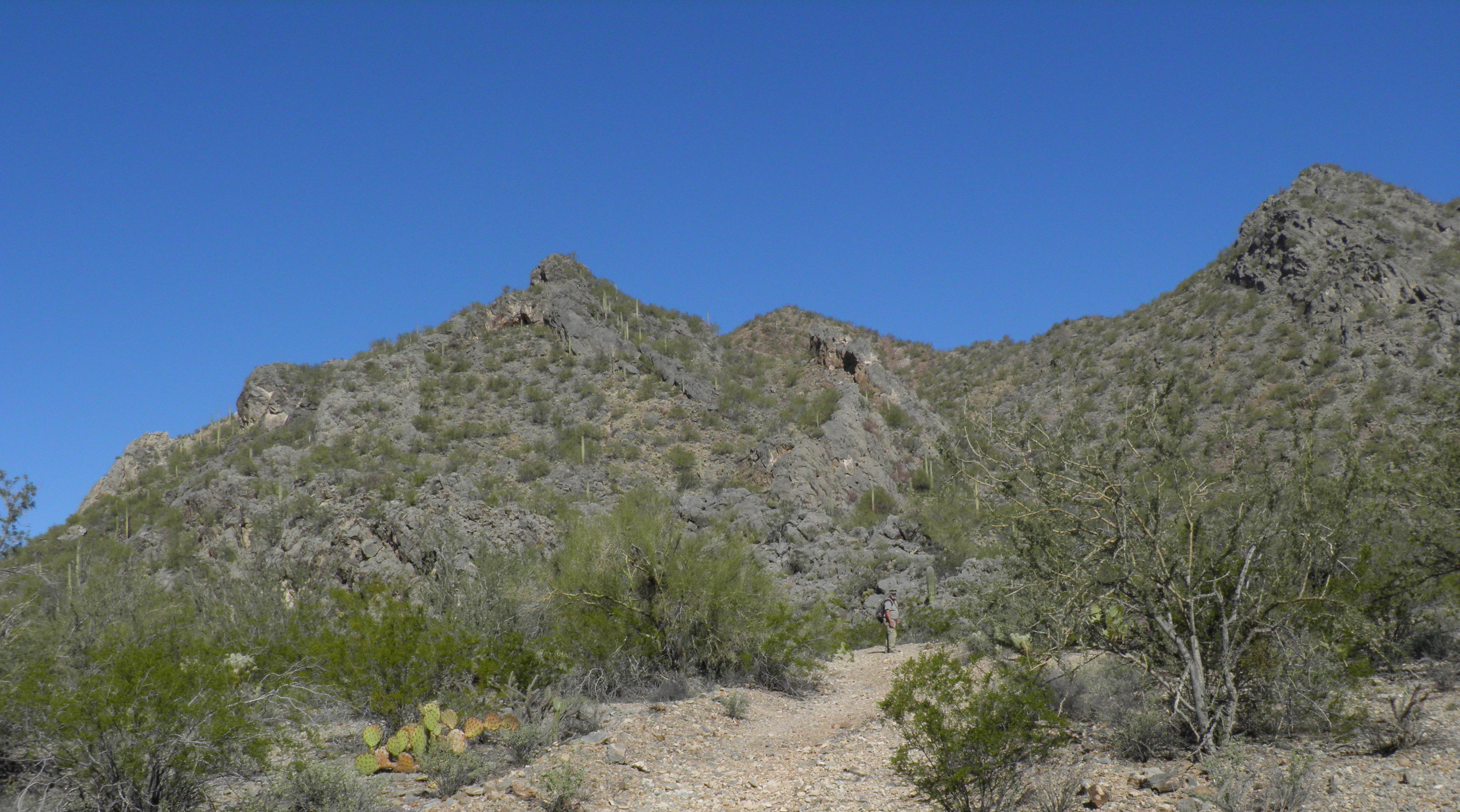

Highest point
- Peak: Waterman Peak
- Elevation: 3,808 ft (1,161 m)
- Coordinates: 32°21′34″N 111°28′37″W

Dimensions
- Length: 6 mi (9.7 km)
- Width: 7 mi (11 km)

Geography
- Location within Arizona
- Country: United States
- State: Arizona
- Region: (north)-Sonoran Desert
- District: Pima County, Arizona
- Settlement: Silver Bell, AZ
- Range coordinates: 32°21′34″N 111°28′37″W
- Borders on: Silver Bell Mountains-N; Avra Valley–Marana, Arizona-E; Aguirre Valley-SW

The Waterman Mountains are a low mountainous landform in Pima County, Arizona, United States. Notable among the tree species is the elephant tree (Bursera microphylla) which species exhibits a contorted multi-furcate architecture; most of these froze in the cold winter of 2011. The Waterman Mountain range is in the Ironwood Forest National Monument.

The Waterman Mountains are not extensive, and merge into the southern section of the Silver Bell Mountains. The south of the range abuts the northwest of the northwest–southeast trending Roskruge Mountains. The highest point of the range is Waterman Peak at 3,808 feet (1,161 m).

== Prehistoric ecology ==
The prehistoric ecology and plant community of the Waterman Mountains area of Arizona has been reconstructed to its composition as far back as the last glacial period, the Late Wisconsin glacial period. Dominant trees of that era, based upon pollen records, were Utah juniper (Juniperus osteosperma), single-leaf pinyon (Pinus monophylla), and redberry juniper (Juniperus pinchotii), along with canotia (Canotia holacantha), and understory plants including Monardella arizonica.
