= Avra Valley =

Landform in southern Arizona, United States

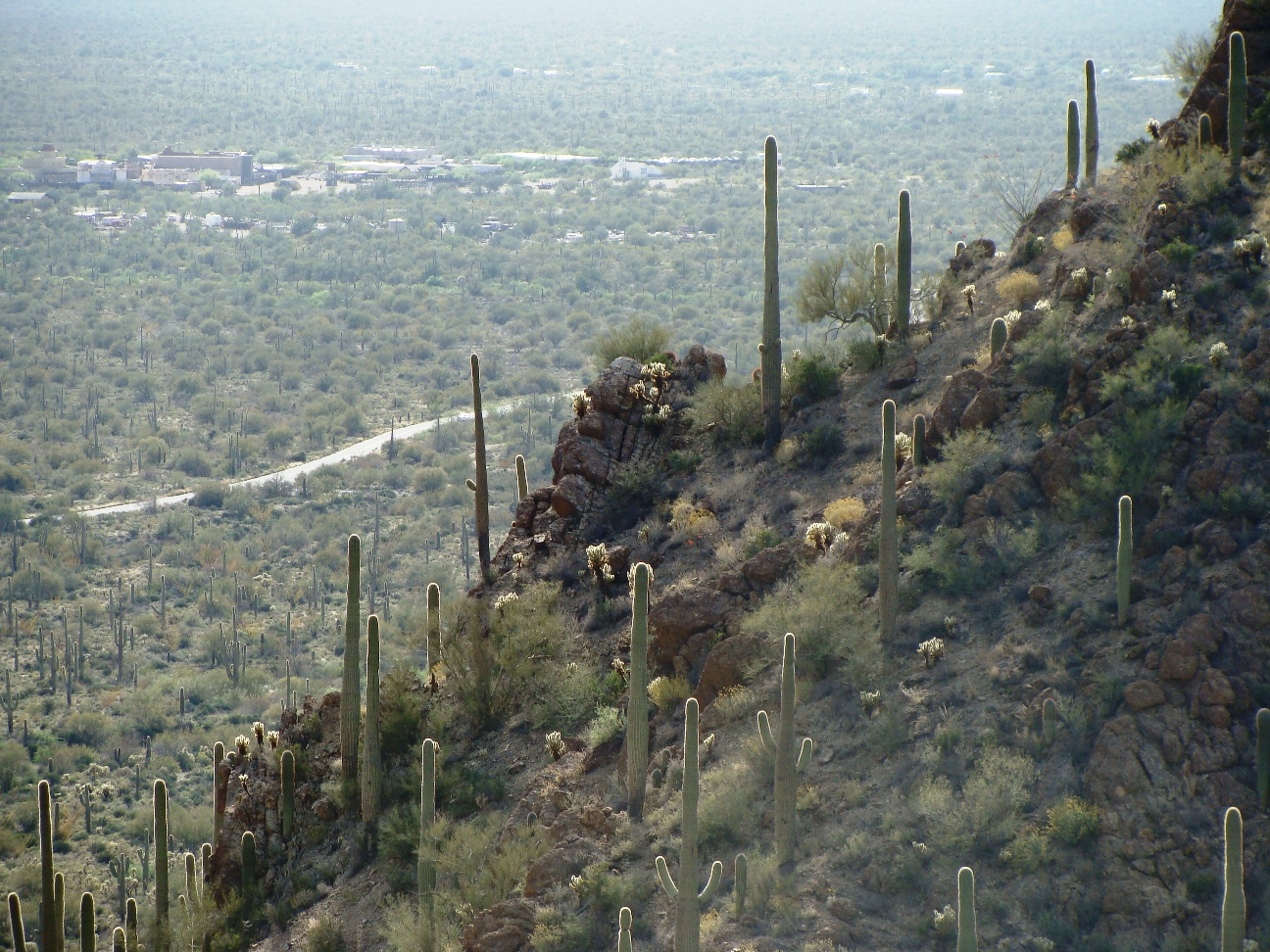
- view of valley lands Tucson Mountains, center east valley

- Location within Arizona
- Length: 45 mi (72 km)
- Width: 10 mi (16 km)

Geography
- Country: United States
- State: Arizona
- Region: Sonoran Desert
- Counties: Pima; Pinal
- Population centers: Marana; Robles Junction; South Tucson
- Borders on: List: Silver Bell Mountains; Waterman Mountains; Roskruge Mountains; Sierrita Mountains; Tucson Mountains; I-10
- Coordinates: 32.22119°N 111.34205°W
- Interactive map of Avra Valley

The Avra Valley is a 50-mile (80 km) long northwest–southeast valley, bordering the west of Tucson, Arizona. The Tucson Mountains are at the valley's center-east, with suburbs ranging east of the Tucson Mountains and trending northwest to the Avra Valley's northeast. This entire northwest stretch from Tucson contains the northwest trending Interstate 10, the route to Casa Grande and Phoenix. The northeast of the valley contains Marana on I-10, the Pinal Airpark, an aircraft storage park, and other communities along I-10. Avra Valley Airport is a general aviation airport in Marana, located about 15 miles (24 km) northwest of Tucson, and being used for storage of classic propeller-era airliners.

The center-(west) of the valley is at Cocoraque Butte, 32.22119°N 111.34205°W, extended northeast from the Roskruge Mountains. Cocoraque Butte's height is 2,758 feet (841 m).

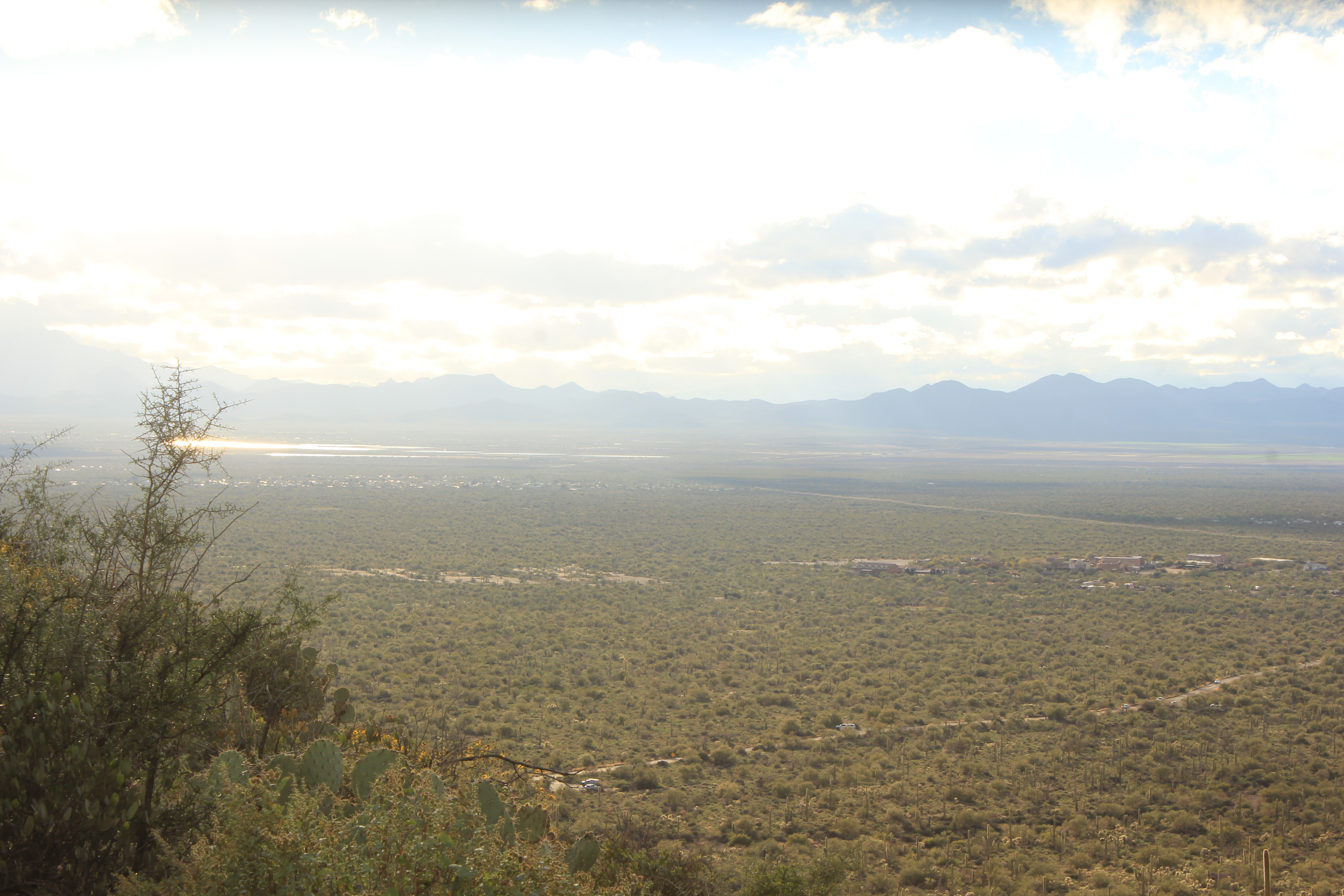
Avra Valley from Gates Pass (Eastern Boundary)

== Description ==
Avra Valley is a narrow valley, only about 10 miles wide in some locations, and bordered completely on the west by low-elevation, arid mountain ranges. From the northwest, the mountains are the Silver Bell Mountains, Watermans, and then in the southwest the Roskruge Mountains. Much of these ranges to the West of Avra Valley are protected in Ironwood Forest National Monument. South of Roskruge, Arizona Route 86 enters the valley from the Tohono O'odham Nation to the west. Robles Junction, Arizona, is also in the southwest, at the junction of the valley going southwest to Sasabe, the Altar Valley. Robles Junction is also at the northwest of the mountain range on Avra Valley's southern border, the Sierrita Mountains.

The north of the Avra Valley narrows at the Silver Bell Mountains and Marana to the east. The region merges into the wider flatlands associated with the floodplain regions of the northwestern Santa Cruz River where it begins to merge with the Gila River.

=== Saguaro National Park ===
Saguaro National Park protects the northern Tucson Mountains in its West Unit bordering Avra Valley. Saguaro National Park features "forests" of Saguaro, Carnegiea gigantea.

== See also ==
- Mission San Xavier del Bac
- Ironwood Forest National Monument
