= Ragged Top =

Landform in Pima County, Arizona

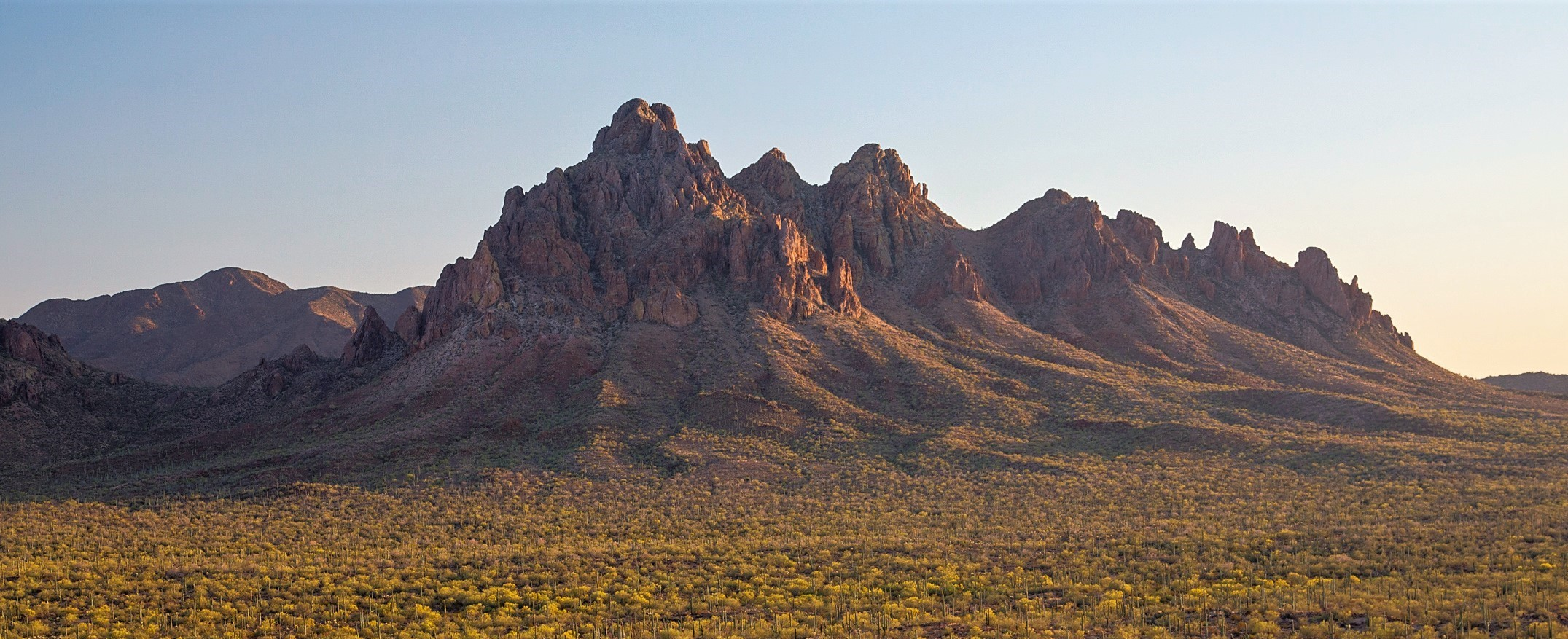
- Northeast aspect

Highest point
- Elevation: 3,907 ft (1,191 m)
- Prominence: 1,347 ft (411 m)
- Parent peak: Silver Bell Benchmark
- Isolation: 2.40 mi (3.86 km)
- Coordinates: 32°26′58″N 111°29′24″W

Geography
- Location within Arizona Location within the United States
- Location: Ironwood Forest National Monument; Pima County, Arizona, U.S.
- Parent range: Silver Bell Mountains
- Topo map: USGS Silver Bell East

Geology
- Rock age: Cretaceous to Tertiary
- Mountain type: volcanic plug
- Rock type: Rhyolite

Climbing
- Easiest route: class 3 scrambling

Ragged Top is a 3,907-foot-elevation (1,191 m) mountain summit located within Ironwood Forest National Monument, in Pima County of southern Arizona. It is situated 35 miles northwest of Tucson, in the Silver Bell Mountains, where it rises over 1,700 feet (520 m) above the surrounding terrain as a landmark of the area. Ragged Top is the biological and geological crown jewel of the monument for sightseeing and wildlife viewing, such as the desert bighorn sheep and the desert tortoise. Ragged Top contains the greatest richness of species within the Sonoran Desert, including 401 plant species. Cathestecum erectum (common name false grama) is only found on Ragged Top in the state of Arizona. Saguaro and ironwood forests cover the bajadas surrounding this mountain. This geographical feature lies within the Gila River drainage basin. Four small arches are located on this mountain.

== Climate ==
According to the Köppen climate classification system, Ragged Top is located in a hot arid climate zone.

Climate data for Silver Bell Mountains
Month	Jan	Feb	Mar	Apr	May	Jun	Jul	Aug	Sep	Oct	Nov	Dec	Year
Mean daily maximum °F (°C)	63 (17)	66 (19)	71 (22)	79 (26)	88 (31)	98 (37)	98 (37)	96 (36)	93 (34)	84 (29)	72 (22)	62 (17)	81 (27)
Mean daily minimum °F (°C)	43 (6)	46 (8)	49 (9)	55 (13)	63 (17)	72 (22)	74 (23)	72 (22)	70 (21)	61 (16)	51 (11)	43 (6)	58 (14)
Average precipitation inches (mm)	0.9 (23)	0.9 (23)	0.8 (20)	0.2 (5.1)	0.2 (5.1)	0.3 (7.6)	2.5 (64)	2.5 (64)	1.3 (33)	1 (25)	0.8 (20)	1.3 (33)	12.8 (330)
Source: Weatherbase

== Gallery ==
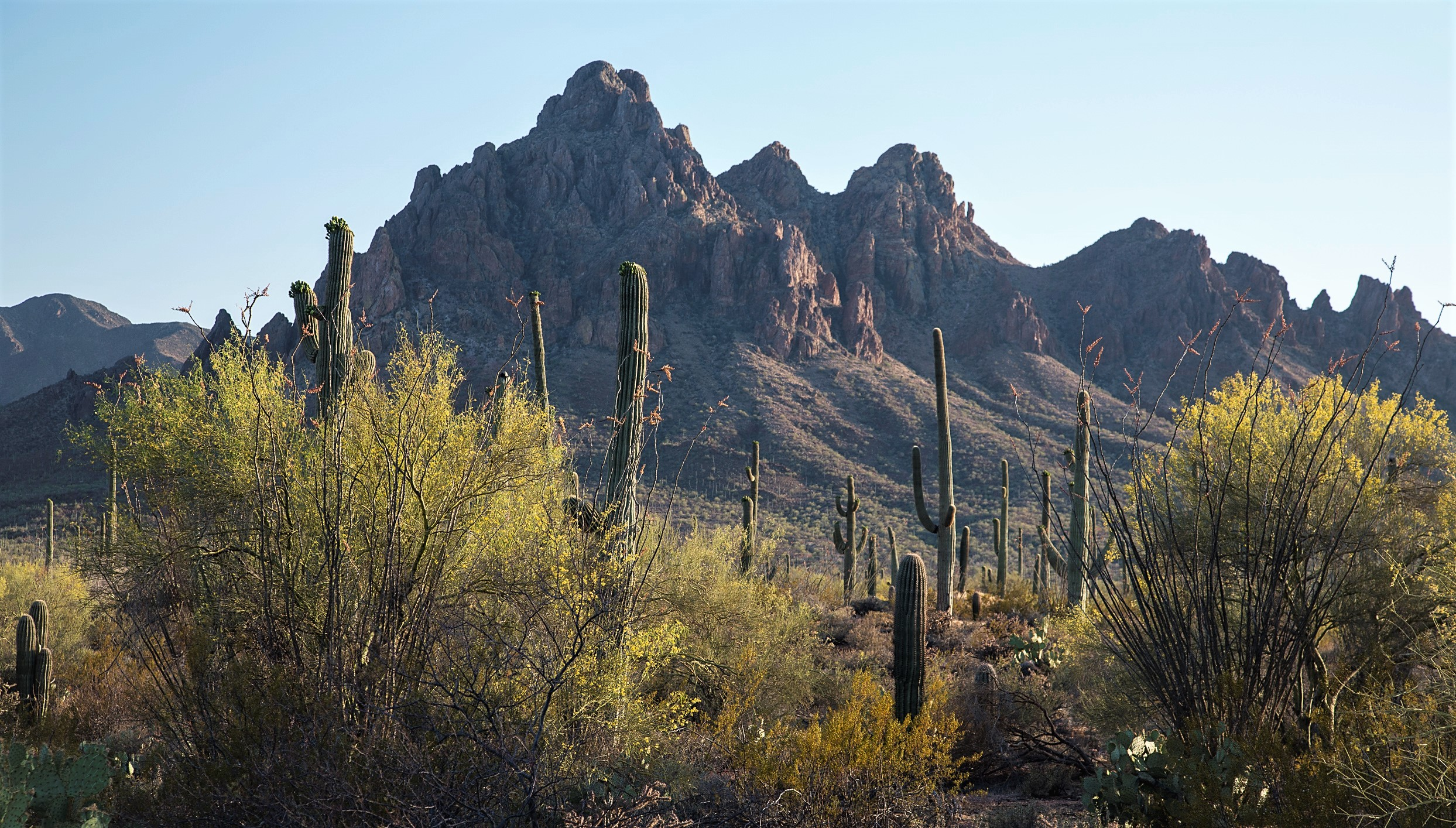

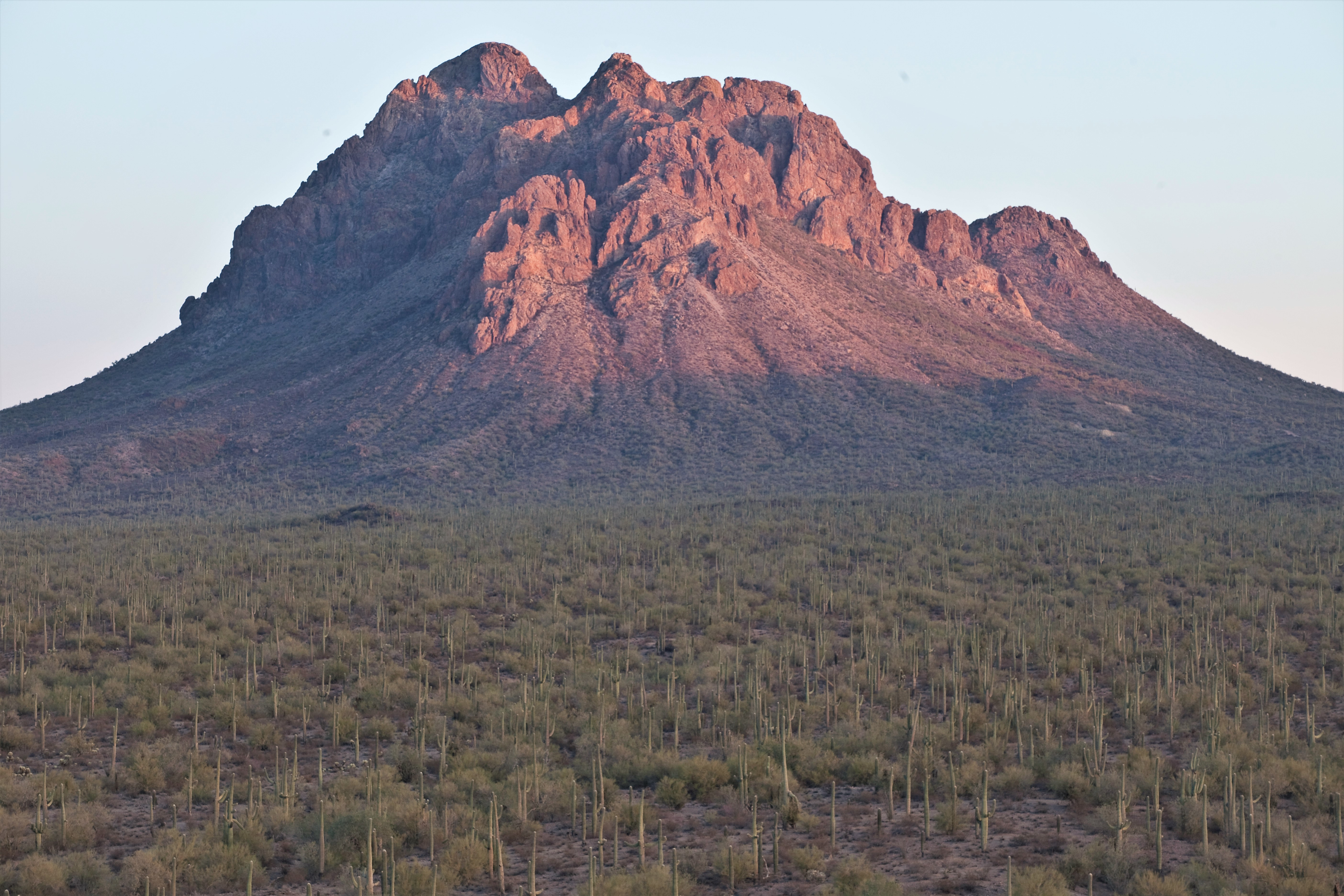
West aspect

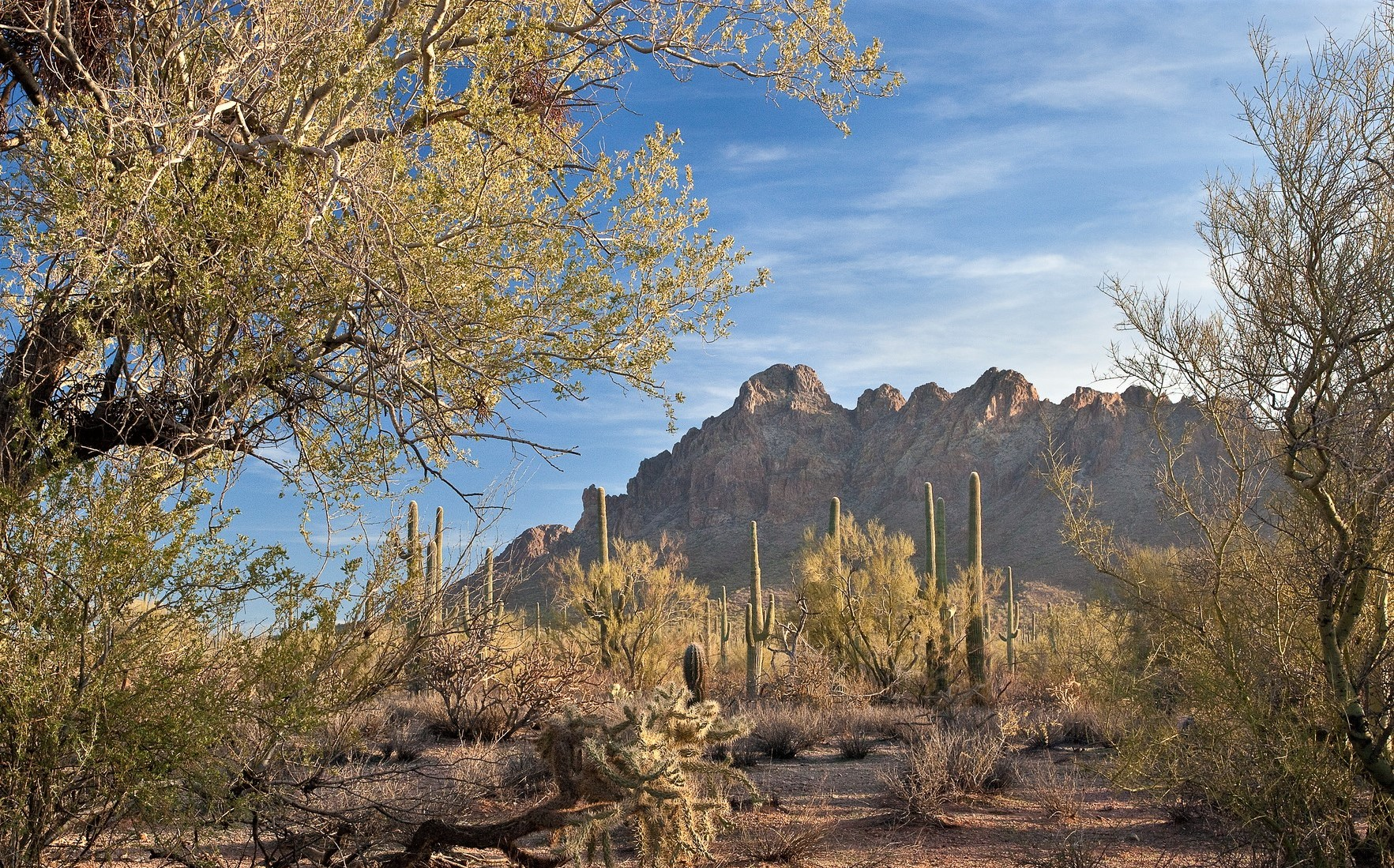
North aspect

== See also ==
- List of mountains in the United States
