= Silver Bell, Arizona =

- Ghost town
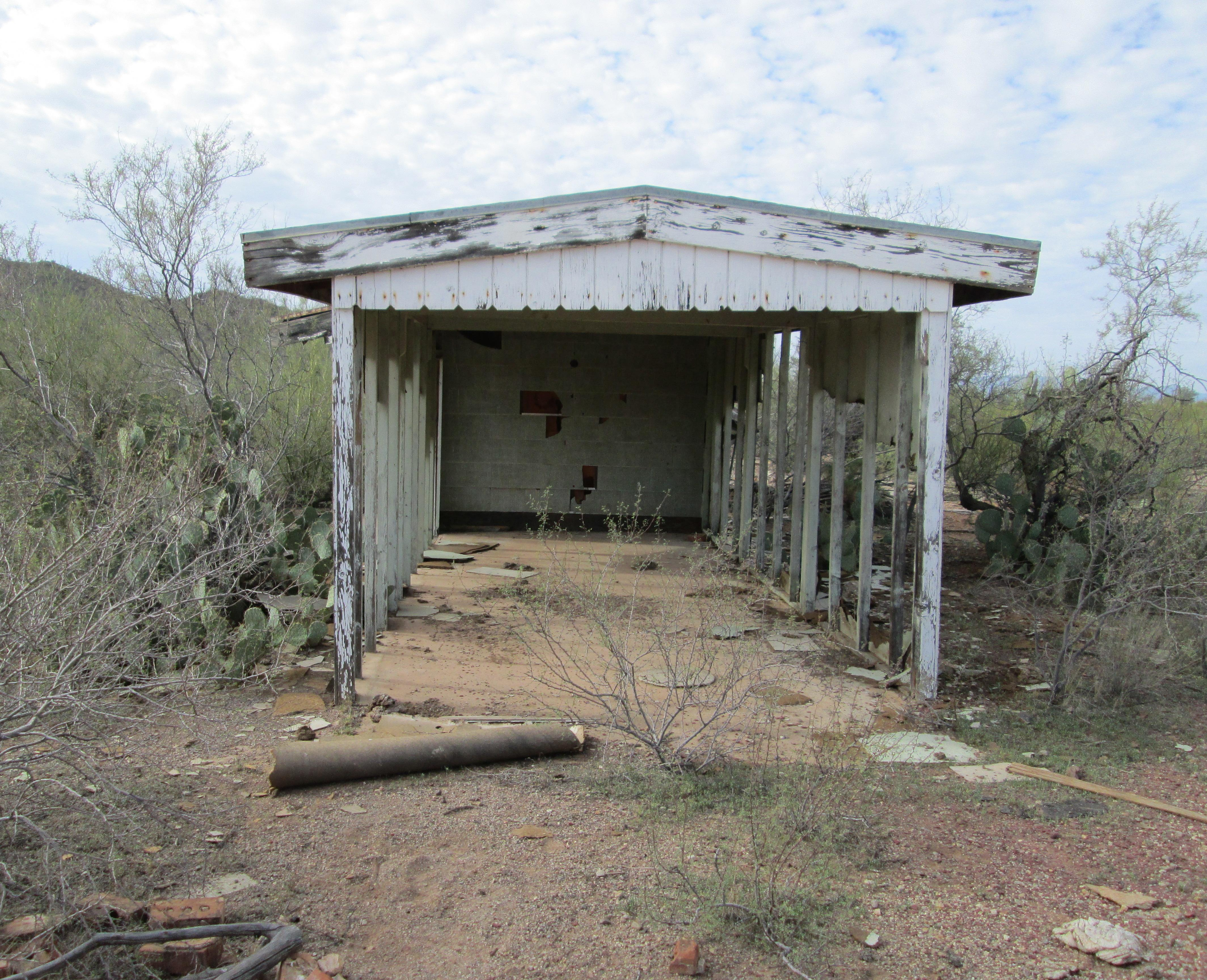
- A ruin in Silver Bell.

- Location within Arizona Location within the United States
- Coordinates: 32°23′05″N 111°29′56″W
- Country: United States
- State: Arizona
- County: Pima
- Time zone: UTC-7 (MST (no DST))
- Post Office opened: August 18, 1904

Silver Bell is a ghost town in the Silver Bell Mountains in Pima County, Arizona, United States. The name "Silver Bell" refers to a more recent ghost town, which was established in 1954 and abandoned in 1984. The original town, established in 1904, was named "Silverbell" and abandoned in the early 1930s. Both towns were utilized and later abandoned due to the mining of copper in the area.

According to James E. Sherman's Ghost Towns of Arizona, Silverbell was "one of the most renowned mining camps in the Southwest," and was also described as "the Hell-hole of Arizona." Today nothing remains of the town other than a cemetery.

== Gallery ==
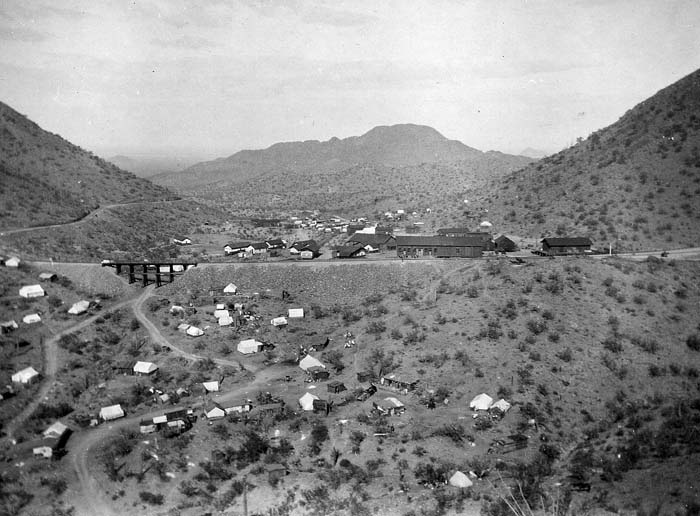
Silverbell, c.1909

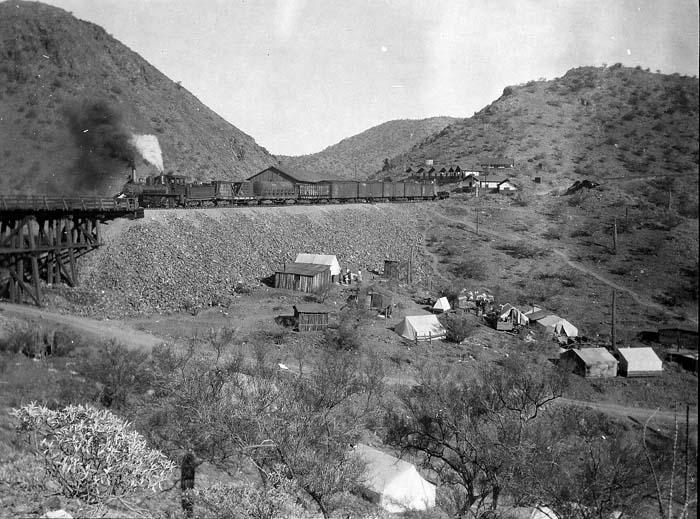
Another view of Silverbell around 1909.

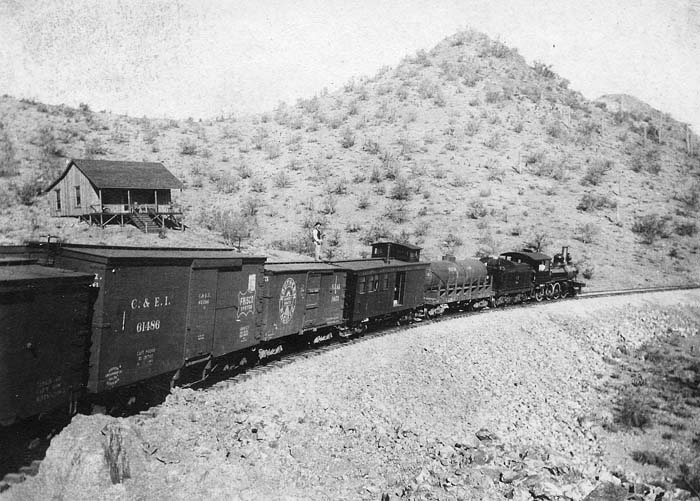
An Arizona Southern train along the road between Red Rock and the Silver Bell Mine.

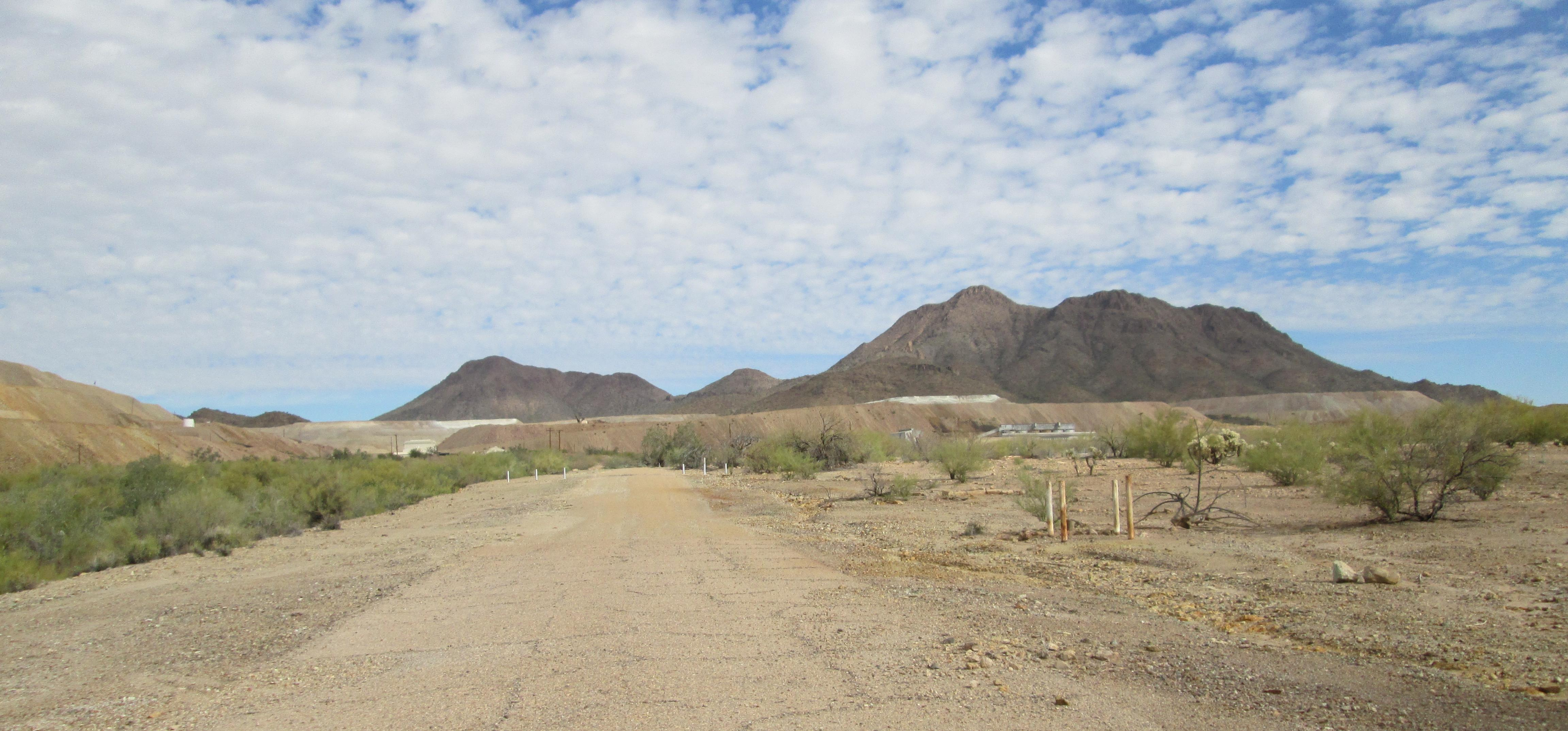
View of the Silver Bell Mine from the site of Silver Bell.

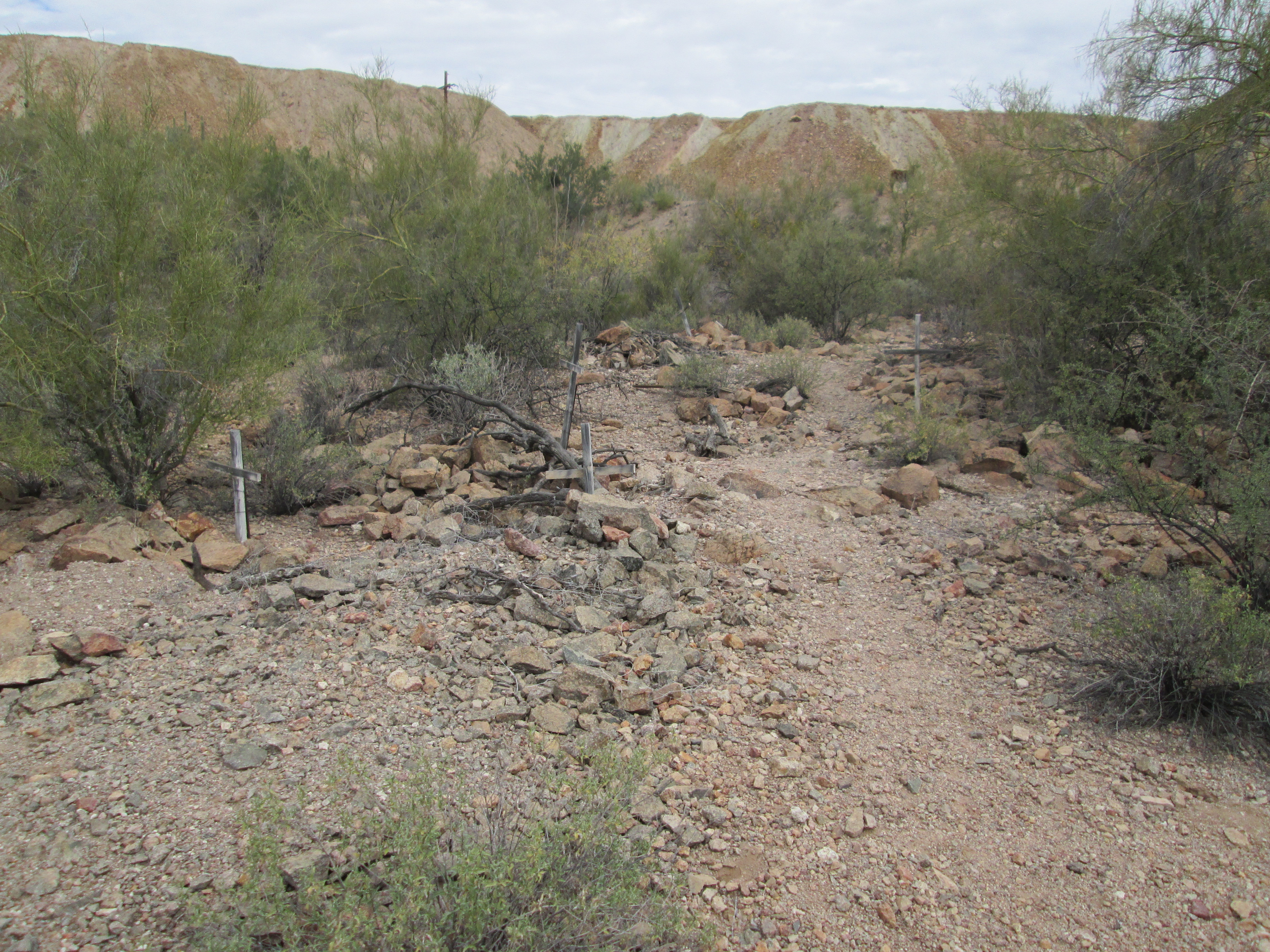
One of the three cemeteries near Silver Bell. Silver Bell Mine tailings can be seen in the background.

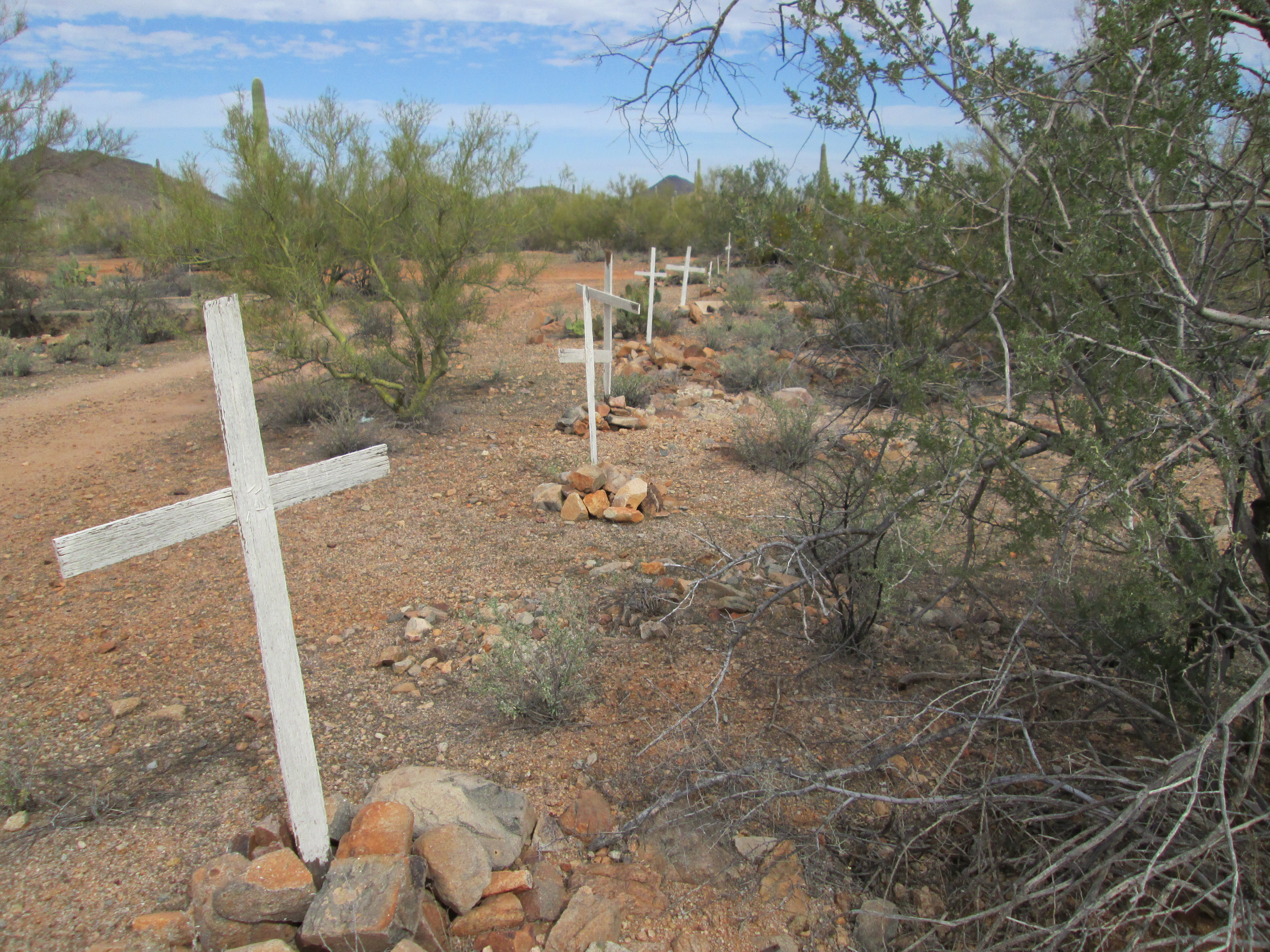
The Silver Bell Cemetery in Ironwood Forest National Monument.

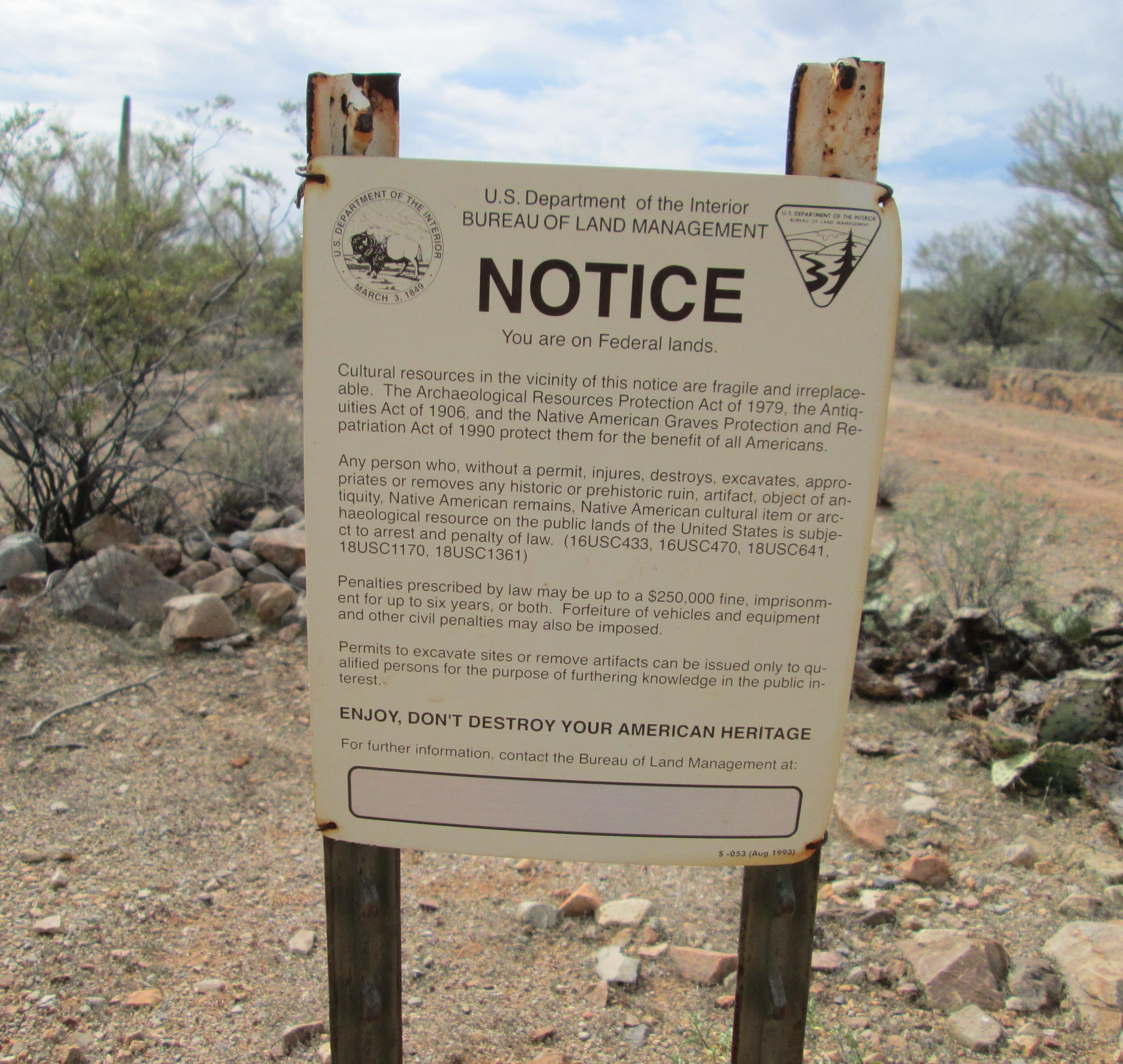
A Bureau of Land Management cultural resources sign at the Silver Bell Cemetery.

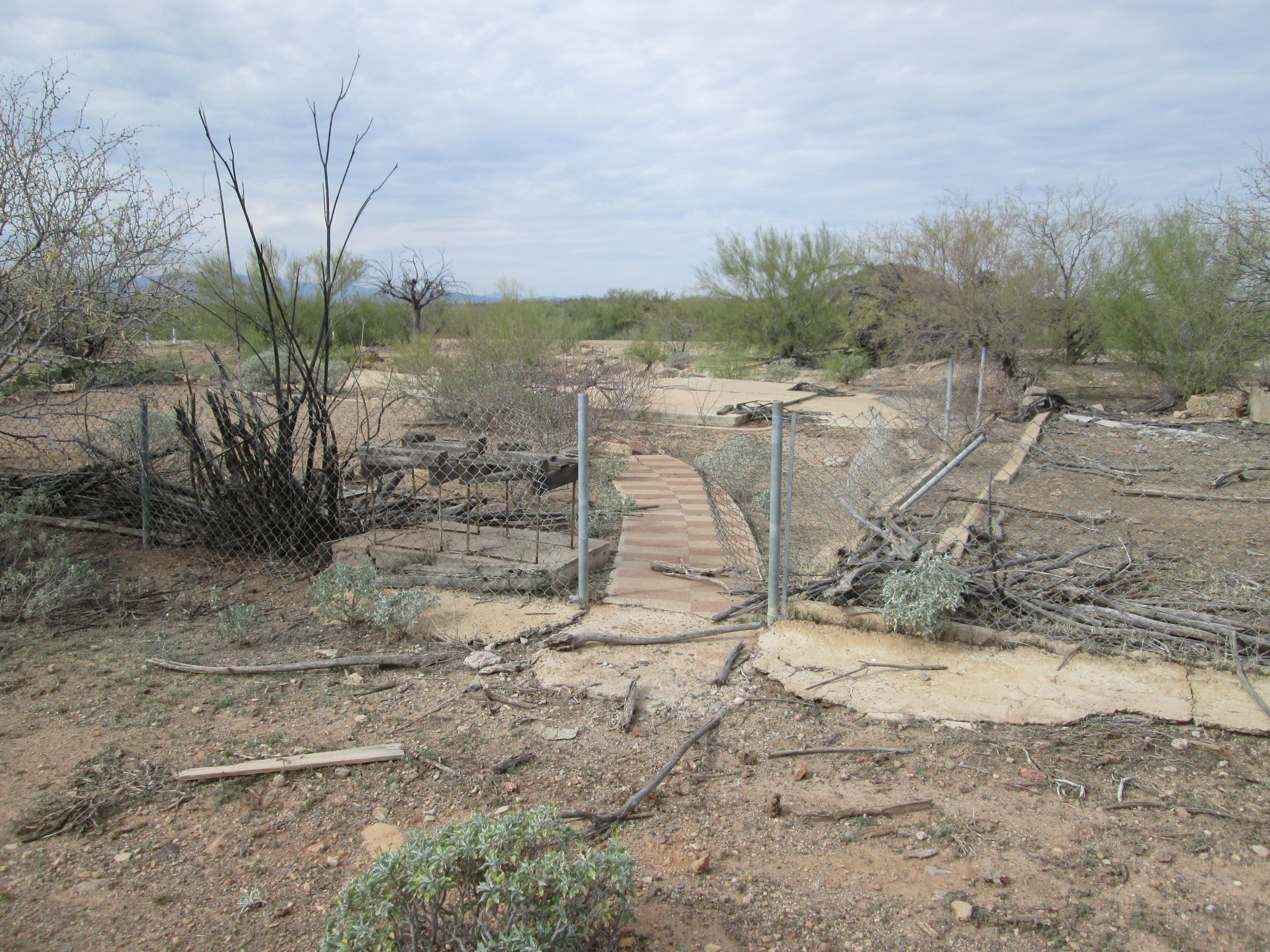
The ruins of a house in Silver Bell.

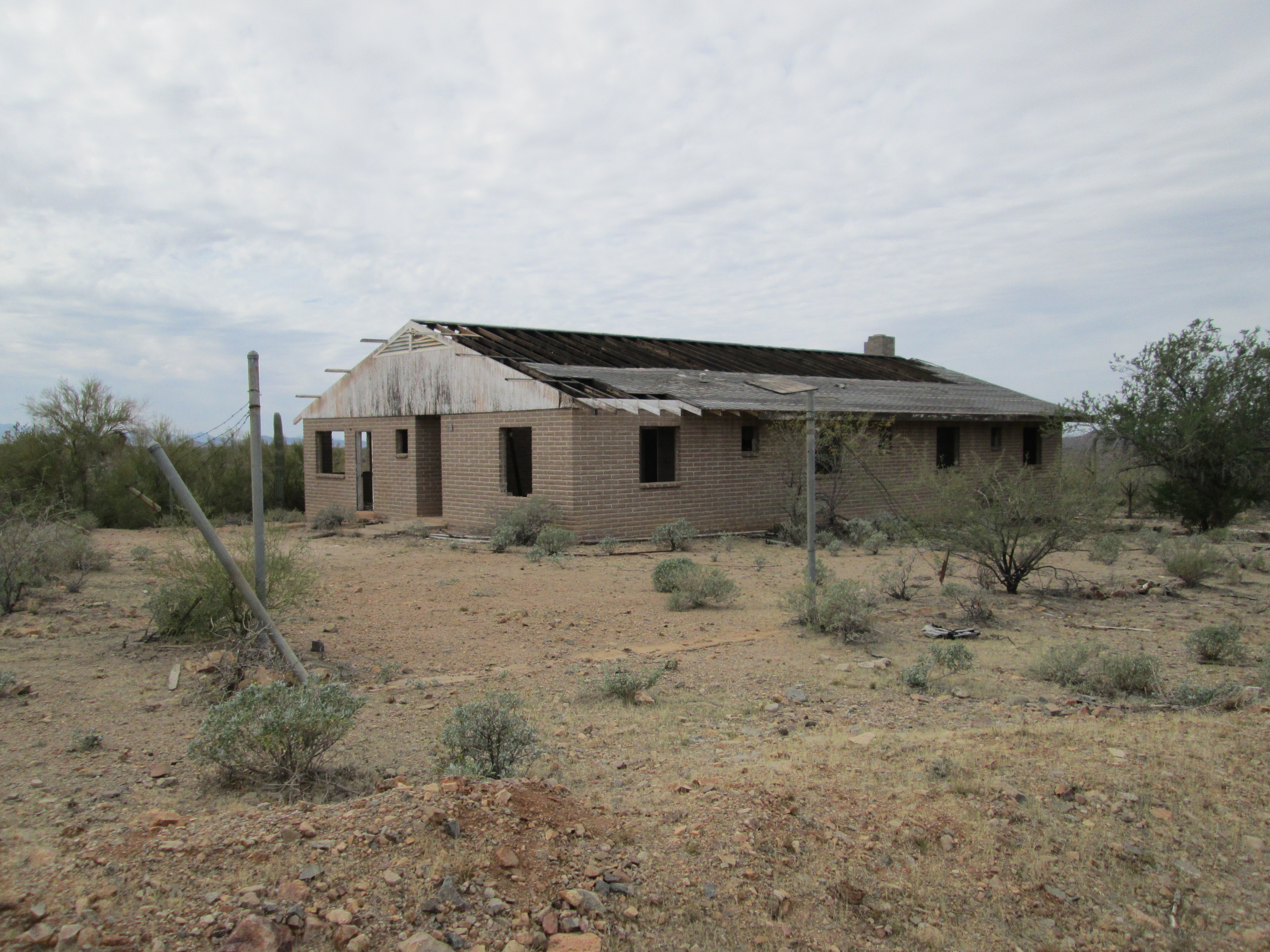
Ruins at the BS&K Mine (This was the house of the watchman that was constructed to keep individuals out of the mine).

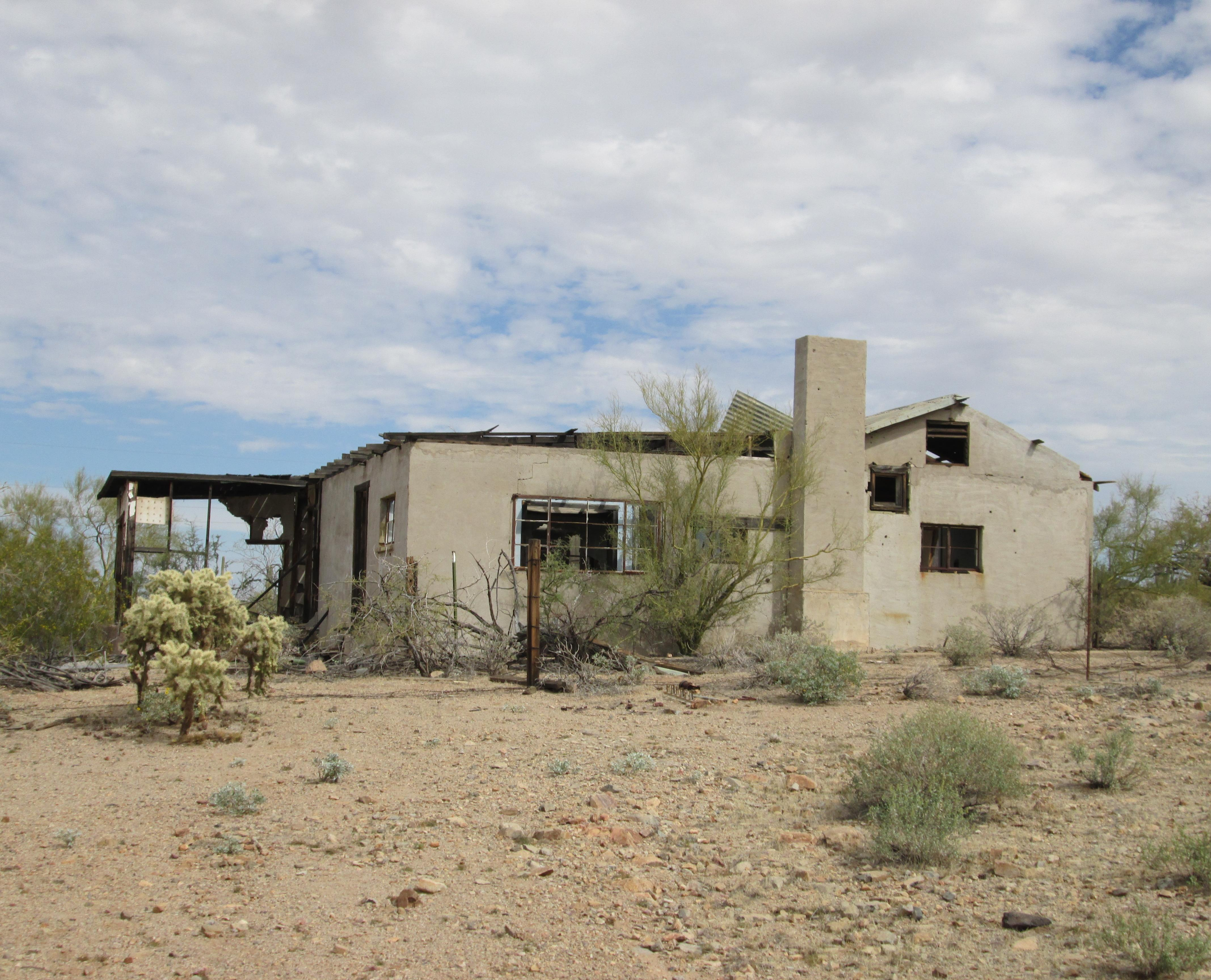
More ruins at the BS&K Mine.

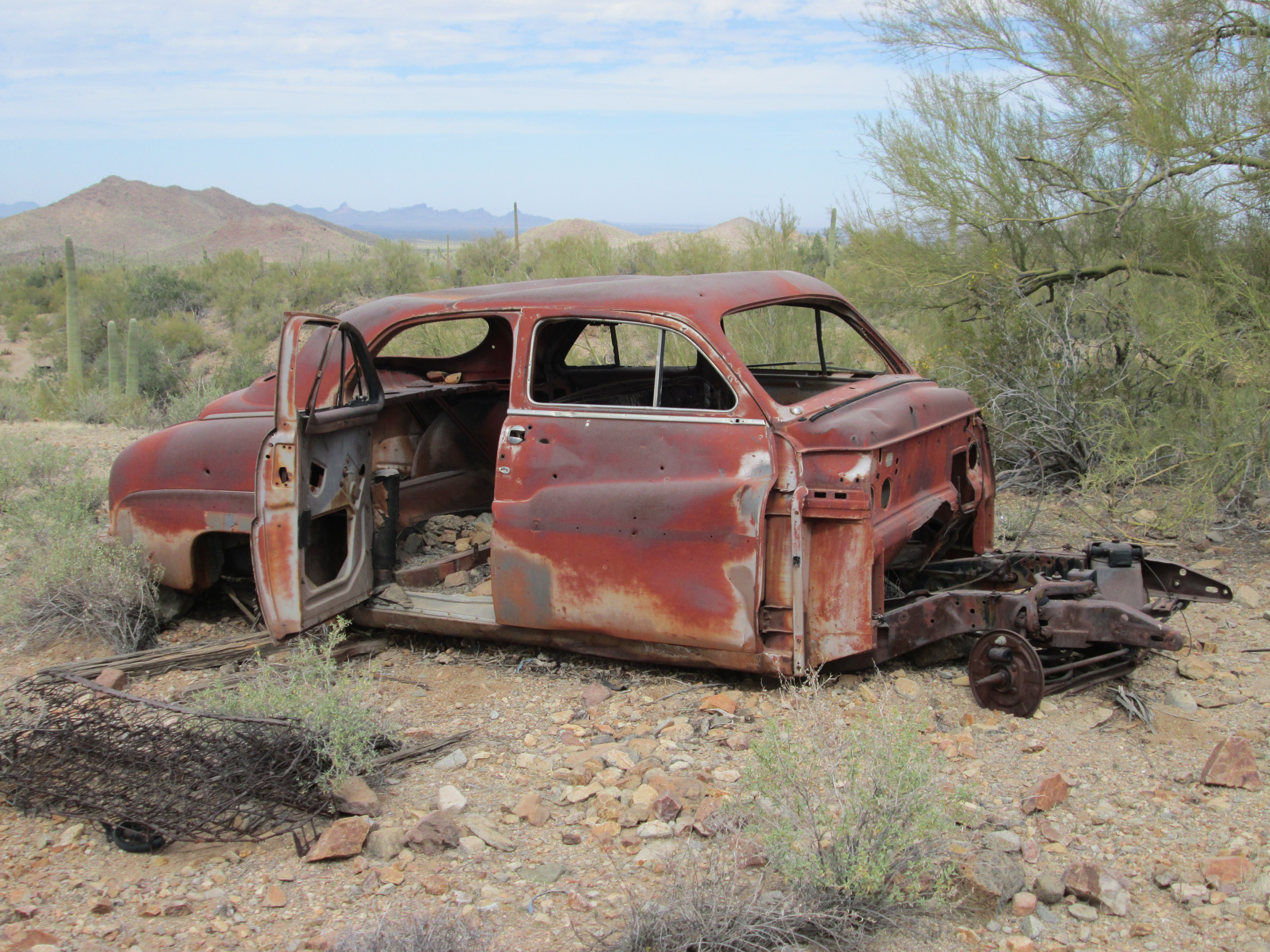
The remains of a car at the BS&K Mine. Notice the suicide doors.

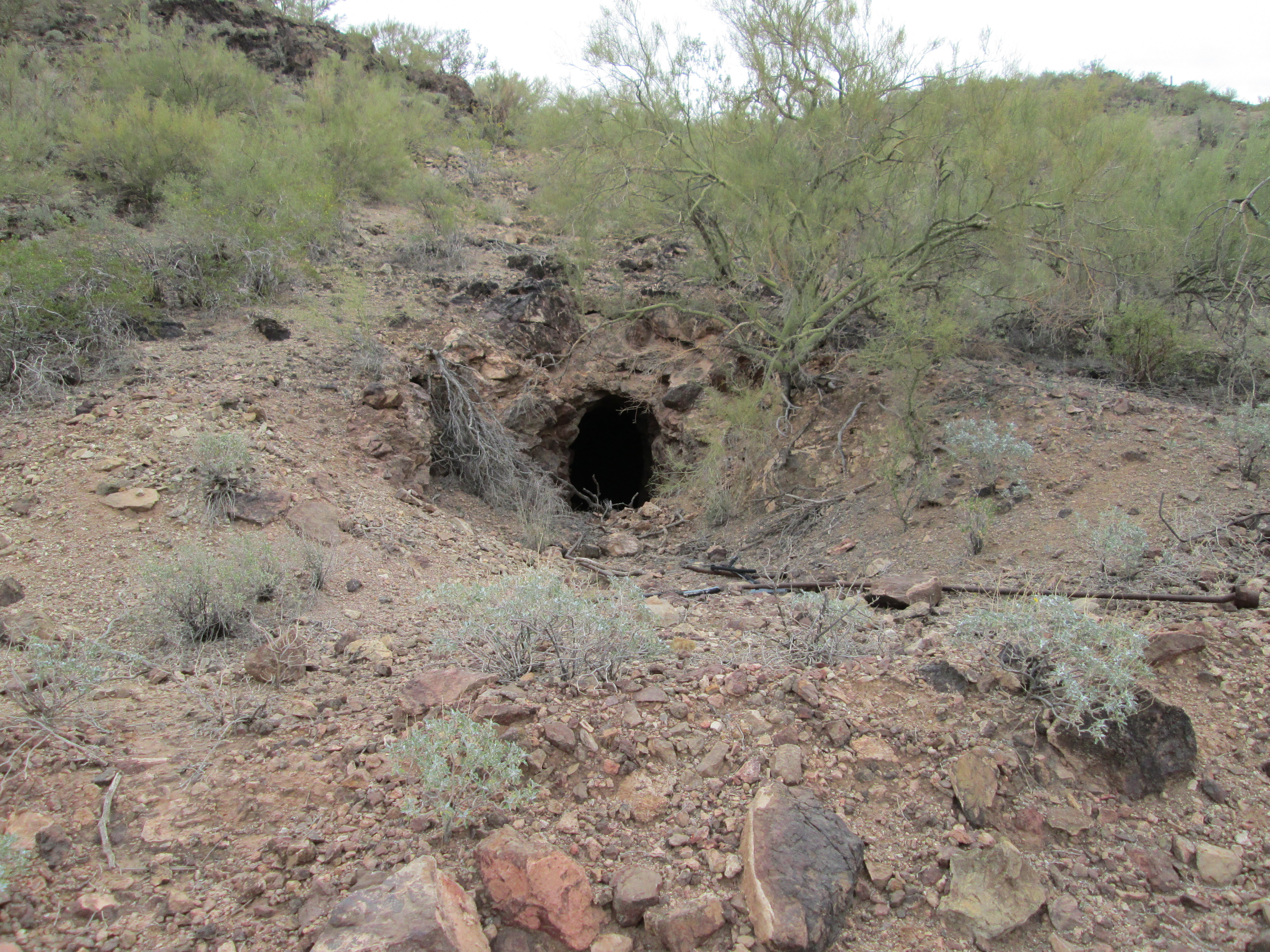
The entrance to an old adit at the BS&K Mine.

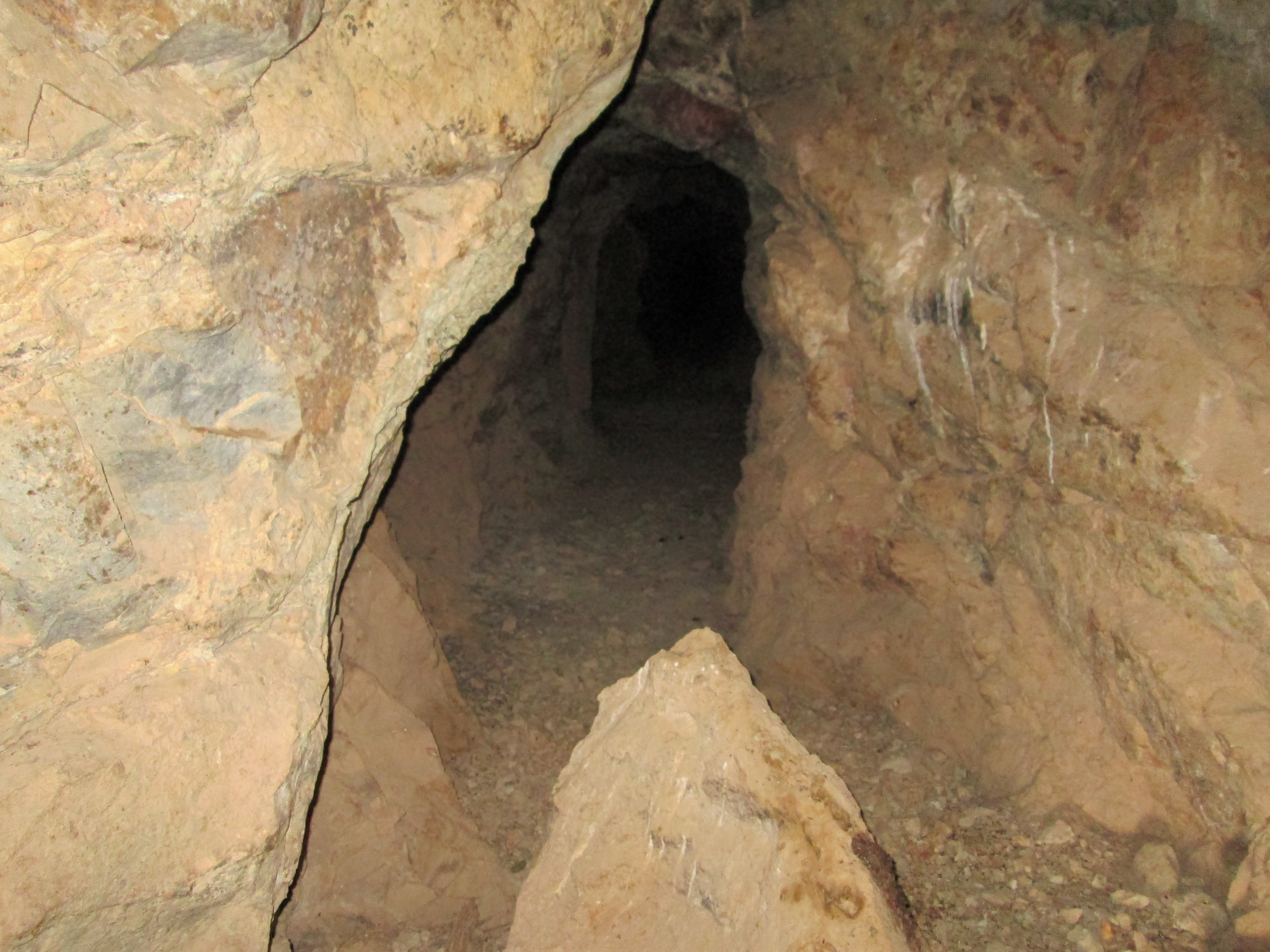
Inside the adit.

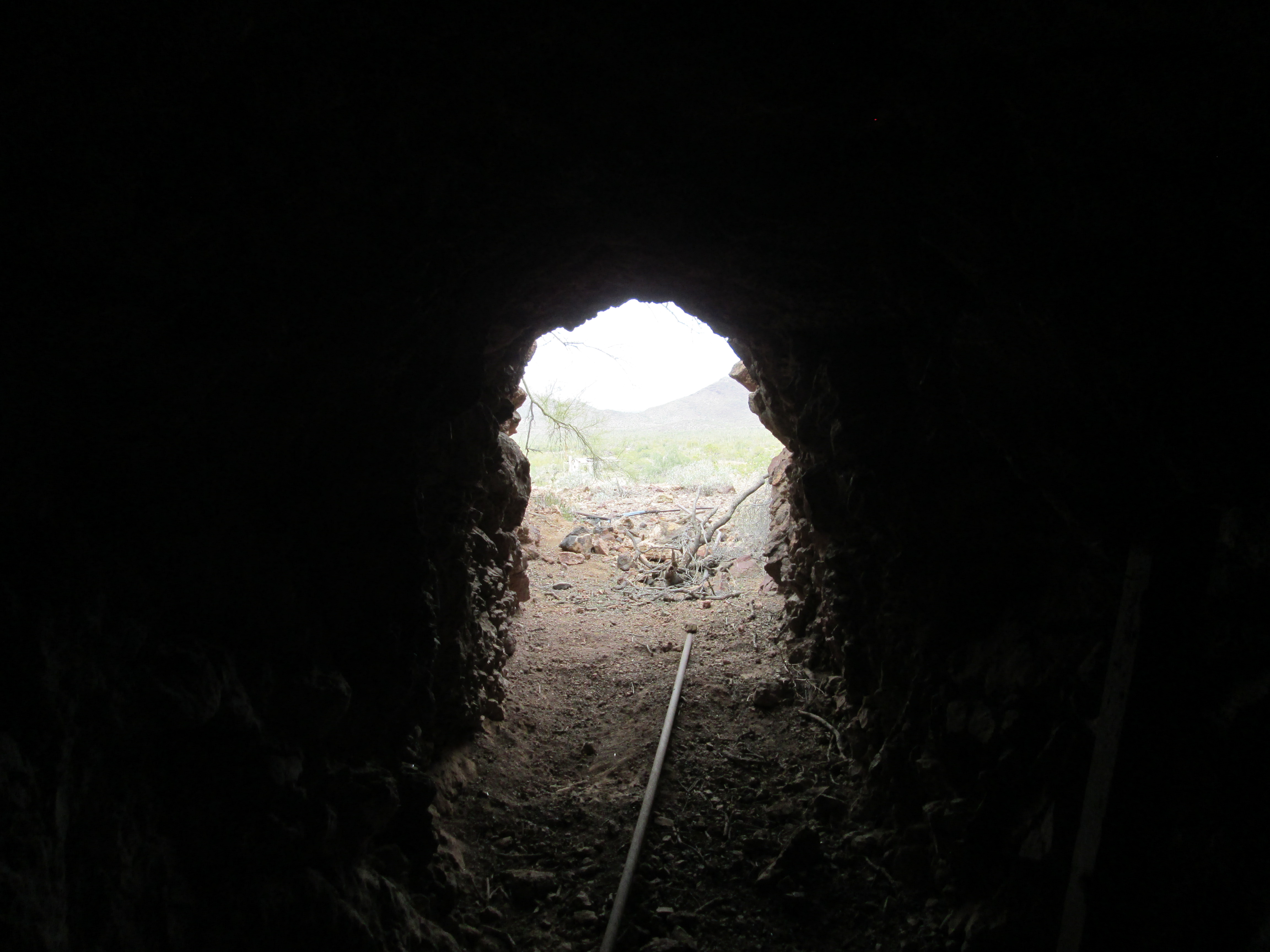
The light at the end of the adit.

== See also ==
- Copper mining in Arizona
- Ironwood Forest National Monument
- Silverbell artifacts
