= Silver Bell Mountains =

Mountain range in Pima County, Arizona, US

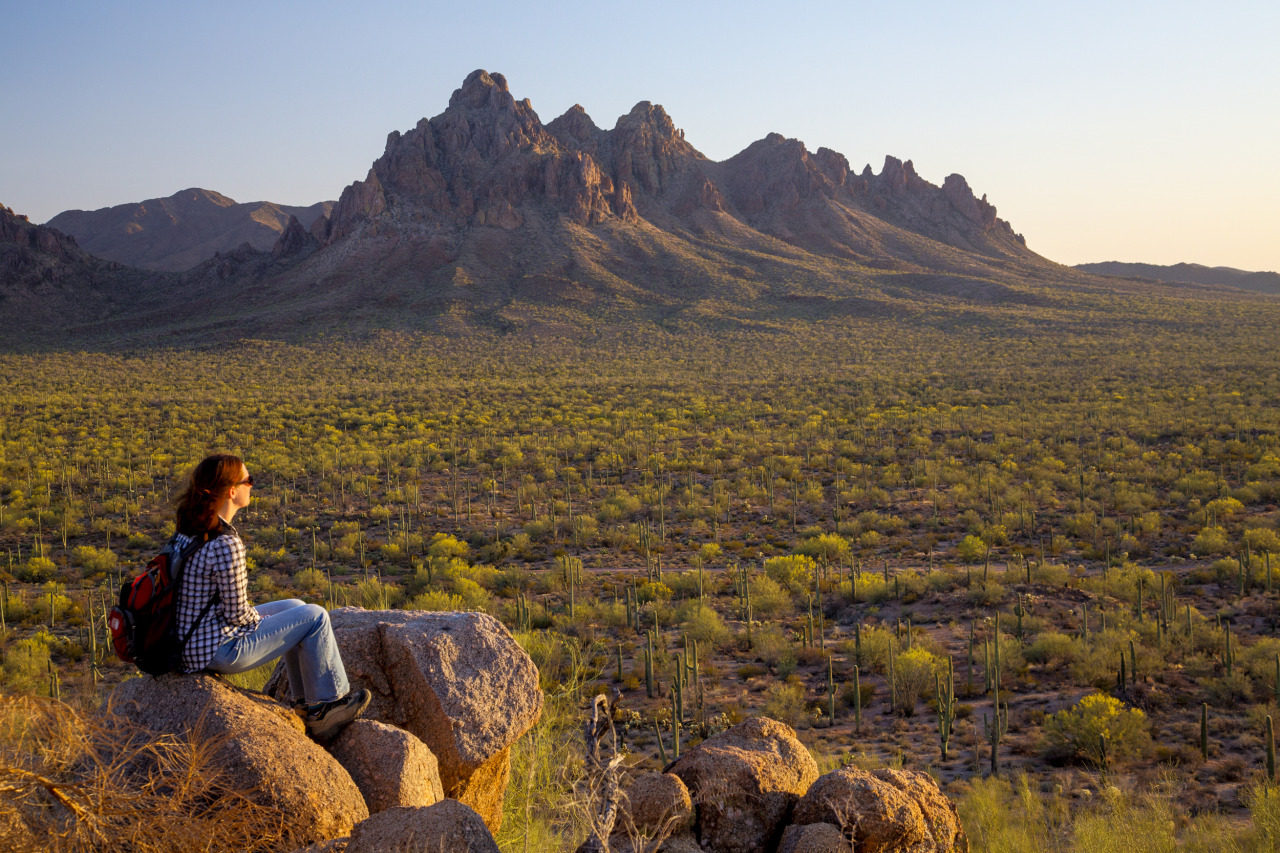
- Ragged Top is a prominent landmark just north of the main range of the Silver Bell mountains

Highest point
- Peak: Silver Bell Peak
- Elevation: 4,261 ft (1,299 m)
- Coordinates: 32°24′30″N 111°29′32″W

Dimensions
- Length: 6 mi (9.7 km) N-NW x SE
- Width: 5 mi (8.0 km)

Geography
- Location within Arizona
- Country: United States
- State: Arizona
- Region(s): Ironwood Forest National Monument (northeast)-Sonoran Desert (Avra Valley)
- County: Pima County
- Settlement: Silver Bell, AZ
- Borders on: West Silver Bell Mountains-NW; Waterman Mountains-S; Aguirre Valley-W & SW; Avra Valley-E & I-10-NE

The Silver Bell Mountains are a northwest–southeast trending mountain range in north–central Pima County, Arizona. The range lies 14 miles (23 km) west of Marana, Arizona, located on Interstate-10, northwest of Tucson.

The range is located to the east of the Ironwood Forest National Monument. Ragged Top, located in the north of the range, is a well-known landmark in this former mining region.

== Description ==
The range is named after the Silver Bell Mine located at the southern end of the mountains. The range abuts the Waterman Mountains to the southeast, where palynology-(pollen) studies have shown some of the recent floristic history of Arizona during the Pliocene. Both ranges lie in the northeast Sonoran Desert; the Madrean Sky Island ranges begin just southeast of here, with the large, and most western sky island range, the Baboquivari Mountains-Quinlans 20–35 mi south.

The Silver Bell range can be accessed by Avra Valley Road and Silver Bell Road from the south of Marana.

== Climate ==
Climate is characterized by extremely variable temperature conditions. The Köppen Climate Classification sub-type for this climate is "Bsh" (Mid-Latitude Steppe and Desert Climate).

Climate data for Silver Bell Mountains
Month	Jan	Feb	Mar	Apr	May	Jun	Jul	Aug	Sep	Oct	Nov	Dec	Year
Mean daily maximum °F (°C)	63 (17)	66 (19)	71 (22)	79 (26)	88 (31)	98 (37)	98 (37)	96 (36)	93 (34)	84 (29)	72 (22)	62 (17)	81 (27)
Mean daily minimum °F (°C)	43 (6)	46 (8)	49 (9)	55 (13)	63 (17)	72 (22)	74 (23)	72 (22)	70 (21)	61 (16)	51 (11)	43 (6)	58 (14)
Average precipitation inches (mm)	0.9 (23)	0.9 (23)	0.8 (20)	0.2 (5.1)	0.2 (5.1)	0.3 (7.6)	2.5 (64)	2.5 (64)	1.3 (33)	1 (25)	0.8 (20)	1.3 (33)	12.8 (330)
Source: Weatherbase

== See also ==
- Ironwood Forest National Monument
- List of mountain ranges of Pima County, Arizona
- List of mountain ranges of Arizona
