= Ironwood Forest National Monument =

Protected area in the Sonoran Desert of Arizona

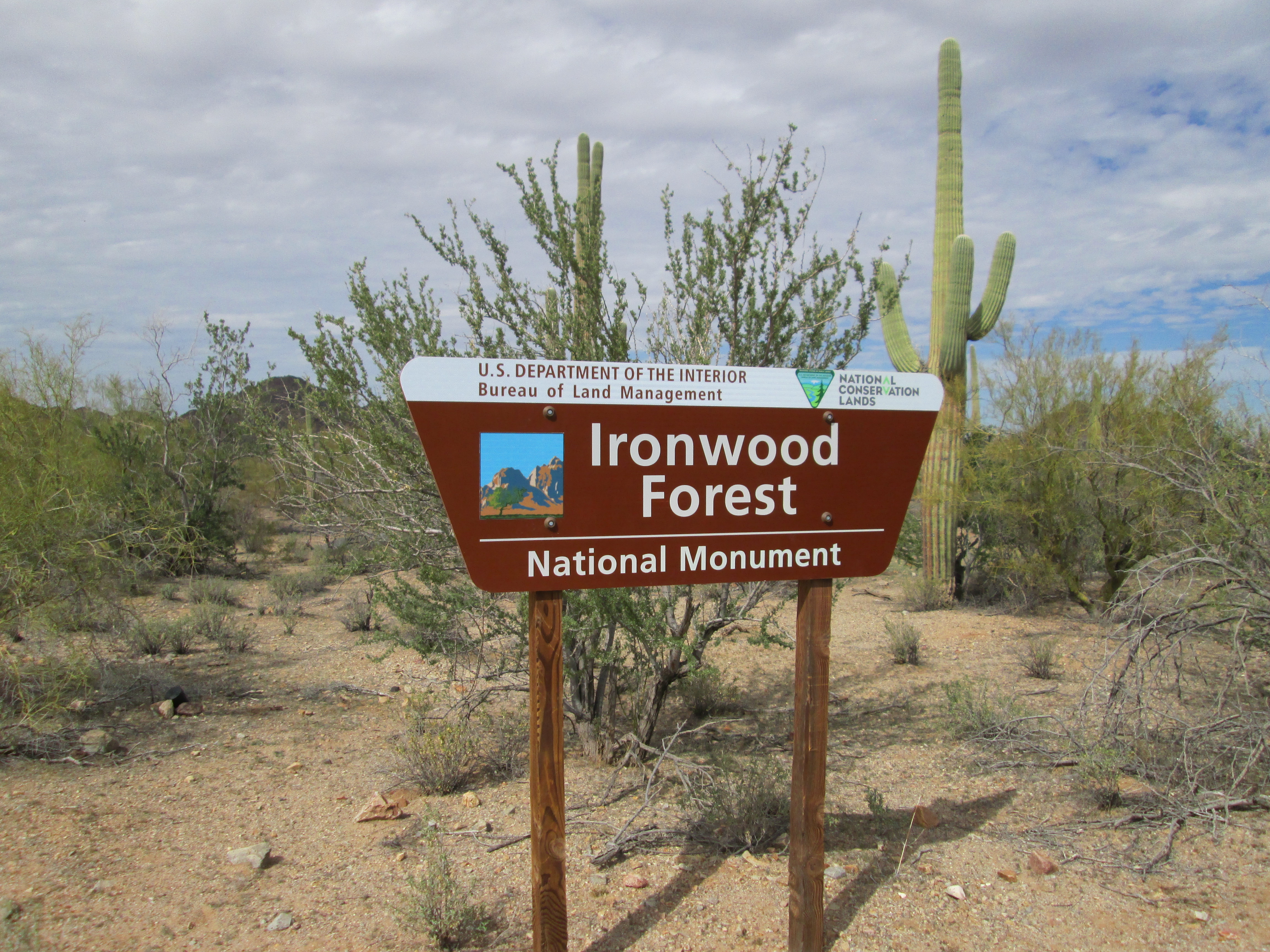

- Location within Arizona Location within the United States
- Interactive map of Ironwood Forest National Monument
- Location: Pima County & Pinal County, Arizona, United States
- Nearest city: Tucson, AZ
- Coordinates: 32°27′32″N 111°34′00″W
- Area: 129,055 acres (52,227 ha)
- Established: June 9, 2000
- Governing body: U.S. Bureau of Land Management
- Website: Ironwood Forest National Monument

U.S. National Monument

Ironwood Forest National Monument is a national monument in Arizona managed by the Bureau of Land Management. It was created on June 9, 2000 through presidential proclamation 7320 and is located in the Sonoran Desert, west of Tucson, Arizona. It covers 129,055 acres (52,227 ha), of which 59,573 acres (24,108 ha) are non-federal and include private land holdings and Arizona State School Trust lands. It is used for recreation, cattle grazing, and mining, although new mining claims and motorized off-road travel are prohibited by the establishing Proclamation.

== Flora and fauna ==
=== Flora ===
A significant concentration of desert ironwood trees (Olneya tesota) are found in the monument, along with two federally recognized endangered animal and plant species: the elephant tree (Bursera microphylla) and small populations of the endangered Nichols turk's head cactus (Echinocactus horizonthalonius). Although not found among ironwood trees, Nichol's turk's head cactus occur in very localized limestone-rich areas within the monument.

The desert ironwood (Olneya tesota) is a very long-lived tree, with some specimens estimated to be more than 800 years old. Desert ironwood is a keystone species because it provides a nursery environment of shade and protection that enables young seedlings of other species to become established despite the harsh desert climate, where daytime high temperatures can exceed 105 °F (41 °C). The ironwood also provides shade and roosting area habitats for birds. Its smoky lavender-colored blossoms provide nectar for bees and other insects, as well as forage for animals. The blossoms produce bean pods which also provide food for desert animals.

Lists of dominant plants in the prehistoric ecology and plant community of the Waterman Mountains area in the monument have been published in a sequence that currently dates back to the last glacial period, the Late Wisconsin glacial period. Dominant trees of that era, based upon pollen records, were Utah juniper (Juniperus osteosperma), single-leaf pinyon (Pinus monophylla), and redberry juniper (Juniperus pinchotii), and understory plants included Monardella arizonica.

The lower elevations are in the Sonoran Desert ecoregion.

=== Fauna ===
According to Proclamation 7320, 674 plant and animal species have been identified in the Silver Bell Mountains within the monument, including 64 species of mammals and 57 species of birds, although the Bureau of Land Management has been unable to verify those claims. Recent studies by the Arizona-Sonora Desert Museum, however, have documented 560 plant species. Resident birdwatchers have documented more than 80 species of migratory and non-migratory birds.

One specimen of the endangered lesser long-nosed bat (Leptonycteris curasoae) and a night roost were documented within the monument by bat researchers Karen Krebbs and Yar Petryszyn. They concluded that while the monument may be an important feeding stopover during spring migrations, the presence of L. curasoae in the monument is probably low or incidental. Leptonycteris curasoae is one of only a few bat species that migrate long distances, coming from as far south as Jalisco, Mexico, more than 1,600 miles (2,600 km).

The Arizona desert bighorn sheep herd located within the monument is the last remaining relict population of desert bighorn sheep in southeastern Arizona, having first migrated into North America during the Pleistocene epoch. One or two specimens of the cactus ferruginous pygmy owl, which was listed as an endangered species in March 1997 and delisted by court order April 14, 2006, have been found within and near the monument by licensed surveyors.

== History ==
More than 200 Hohokam archaeological sites have been identified in the monument, dated between 600 and 1450, and several are listed on the National Register of Historic Places.

=== Cocoraque Butte Archaeological District ===
- Cocoraque Butte Archaeological District
- U.S. National Register of Historic Places
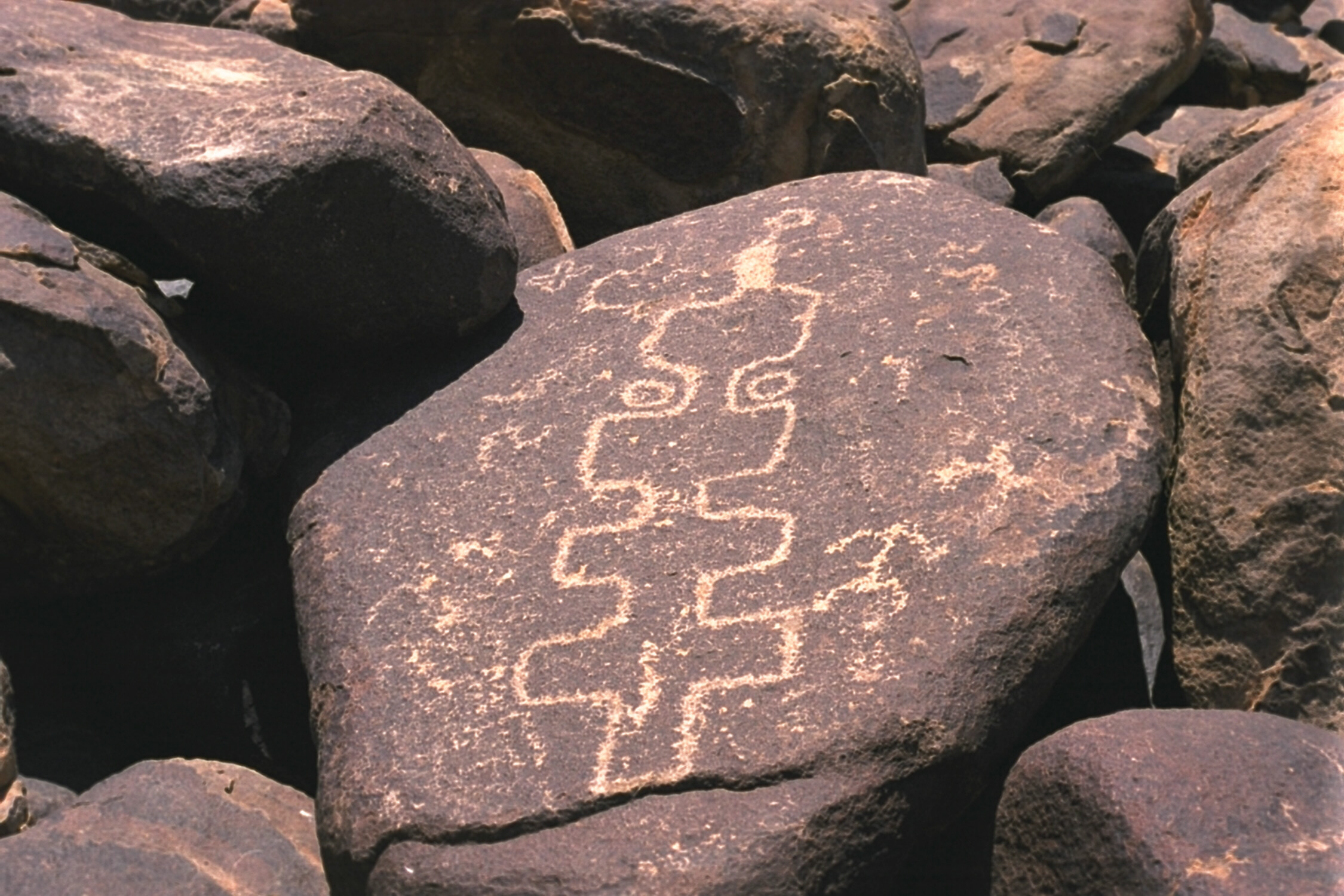
- A petroglyph on Cocoraque Butte.
- Location: Ironwood Forest, Arizona, United States
- NRHP reference No.: 75000355
- Added to NRHP: October 10, 1975

The Cocoraque Butte Archaeological District was added to the National Register of Historic Places on October 10, 1975. It features ancient Hohokam ruins, hundreds of well-preserved petroglyphs, and the historic Cocoraque Ranch. The age of the petroglyphs range from 1150 to 2000 years old.

=== Los Robles Archaeological District ===
- Los Robles Archaeological District
- U.S. National Register of Historic Places
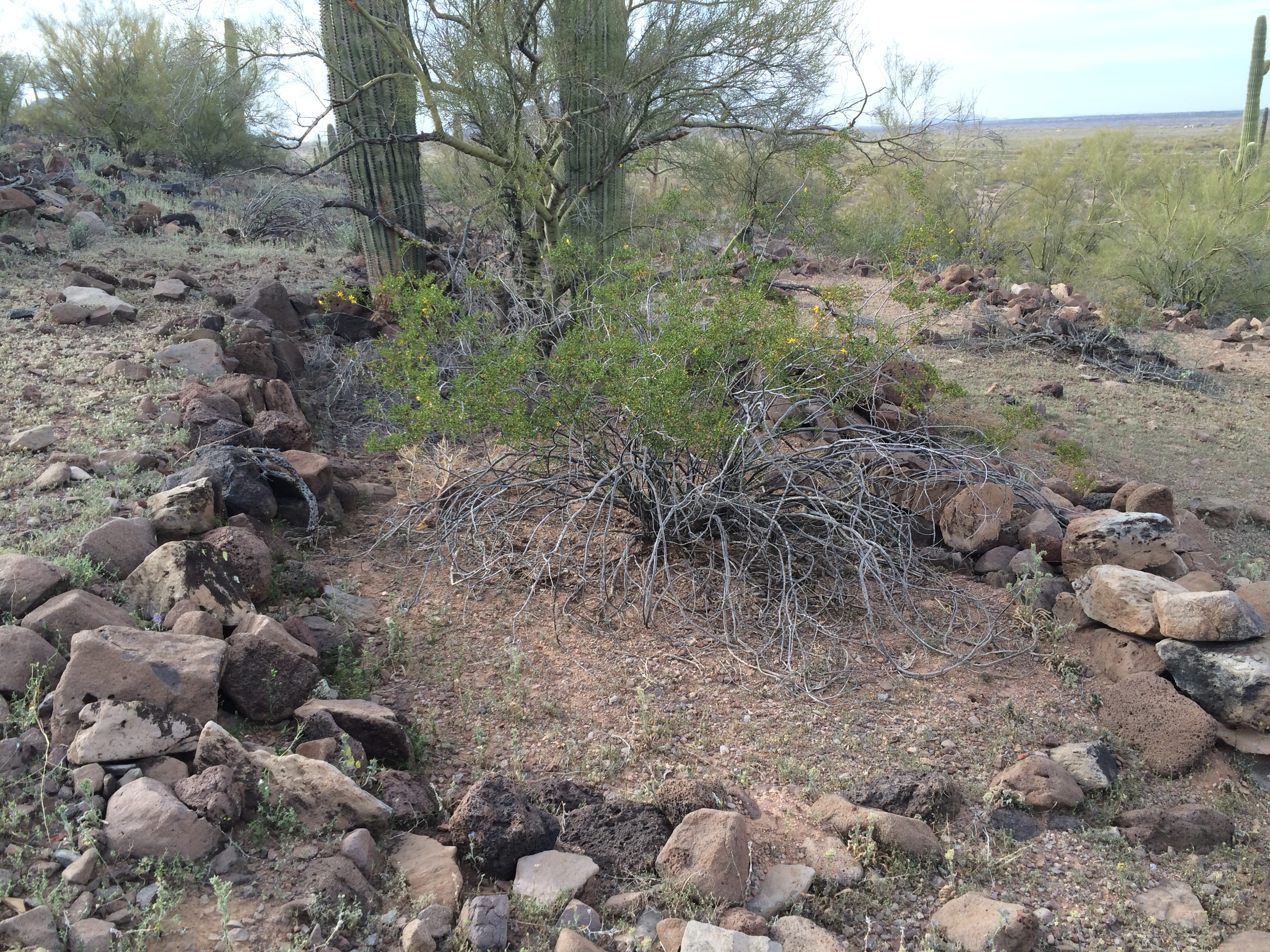
- Hohokam ruins at Cerro Prieto.
- Location: Ironwood Forest, Arizona, United States
- NRHP reference No.: 89000337
- Added to NRHP: May 11, 1989

The Los Robles Archaeological District is nearly 13,000 acres (5,000 ha) and contains over 100 historic and prehistoric archaeological sites, including the Los Robles Platform Mound Community and a trincheras. It was added to the National Register of Historic Places on May 11, 1989.

In 2003, Johnson International Inc. illegally bulldozed 270 acres (110 ha) of state trust land in and near Los Robles, causing an estimated $8,000,000 in damage. Several sites were completely destroyed, including areas within the Los Robles Platform Mound Community. At least twenty-one endangered Desert bighorn sheep were killed, and many others were injured. Over 40,000 protected plants were destroyed when pollutants created by these activities contaminated local water sources.

=== Santa Ana del Chiquiburitac Mission Site ===
- Santa Ana del Chiquiburitac Mission Site
- U.S. National Register of Historic Places
- Nearest city: Tucson, Arizona
- Area: 80 acres (32 ha)
- Built: 1811
- NRHP reference No.: 75000357
- Added to NRHP: September 18, 1975

The Santa Ana del Chiquiburitac Mission Site is a historic mission site located in the Ironwood Forest National Monument.

=== Mining ===
The Hohokam people were the first miners in the area, mining turquoise in the Silver Bell Mountains. Silver and copper mining began in around 1850 and continues today, although new mining claims and motorized off-road travel are prohibited by the establishing Proclamation. Bighorn sheep ewes prefer mine tailings for lambing grounds because the high, steep and open terrain enables them to see and escape from predators.

=== Livestock grazing ===
Livestock grazing, which has occurred continuously for at least the last 125 years within the monument, is currently managed at very light or conservative levels of approximately one cow per every 300 to 400 acres (120 to 160 ha). Domestic sheep and goats are prohibited to protect bighorn sheep. The monument offers almost no surface water but contains sufficient groundwater resources. The cattle ranchers maintain more than 80 individual man-made water sources within the monument, in addition to the 14 water sources maintained by the Arizona Game and Fish Department and the Arizona Desert Bighorn Sheep Society. The presence of human-supplied water supports the exceptional abundance of birds, mule deer, coyotes, foxes, bobcats, mountain lions and other wildlife found in the monument.

== Gallery ==
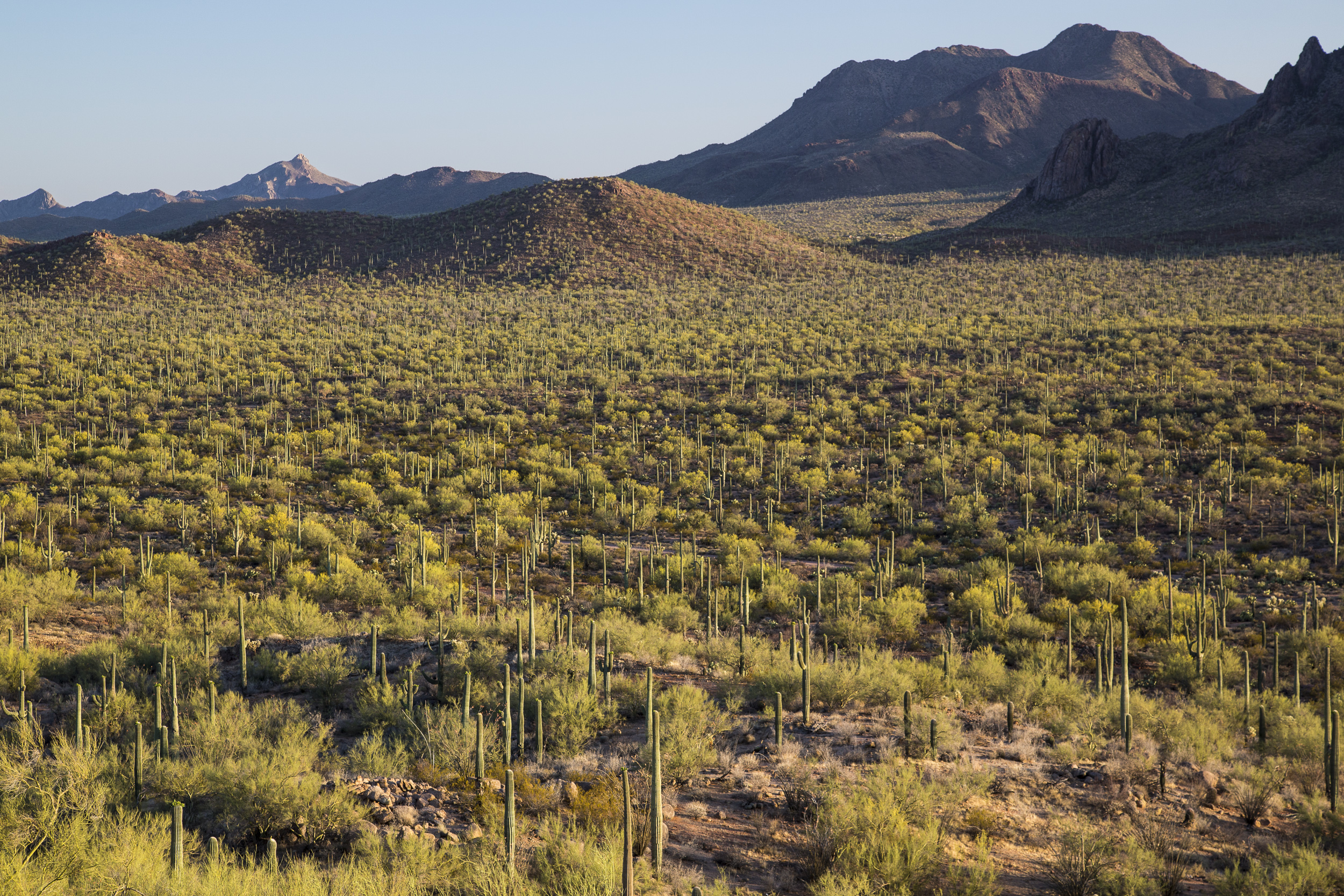
Saguaro forest in Ironwood Forest National Monument

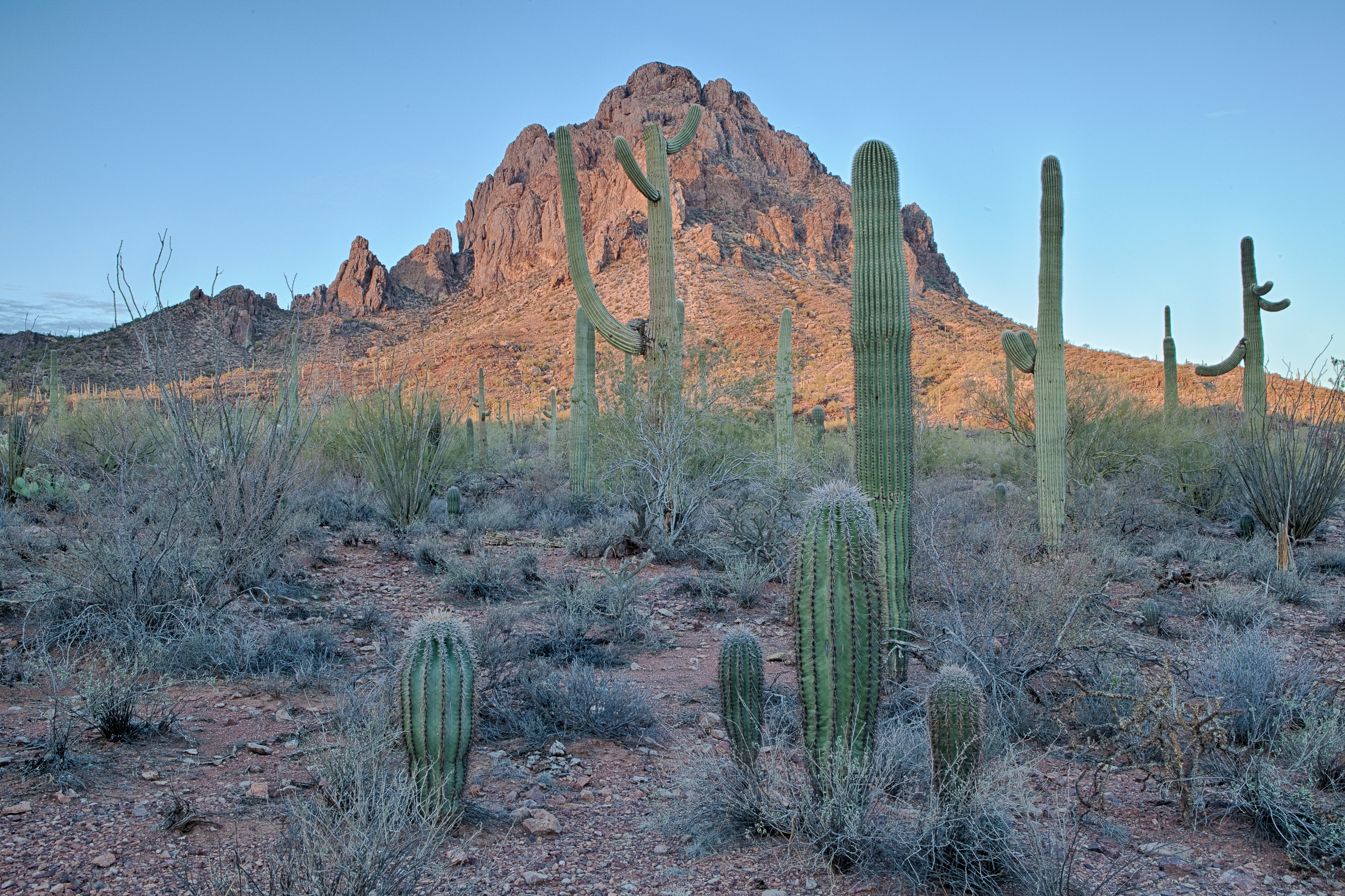
Ragged Top, Ironwood Forest National Monument, Arizona.

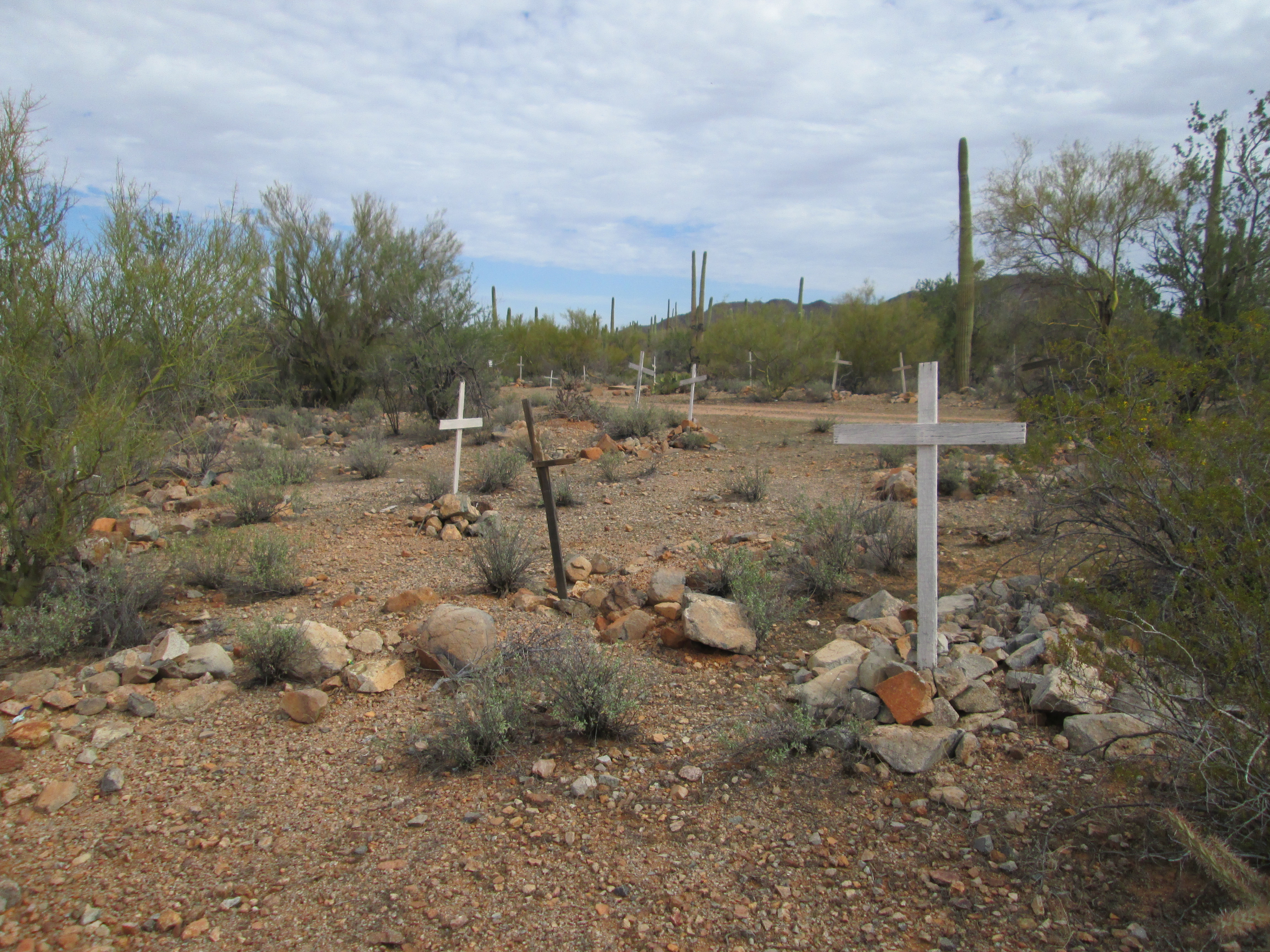
The Silver Bell Cemetery

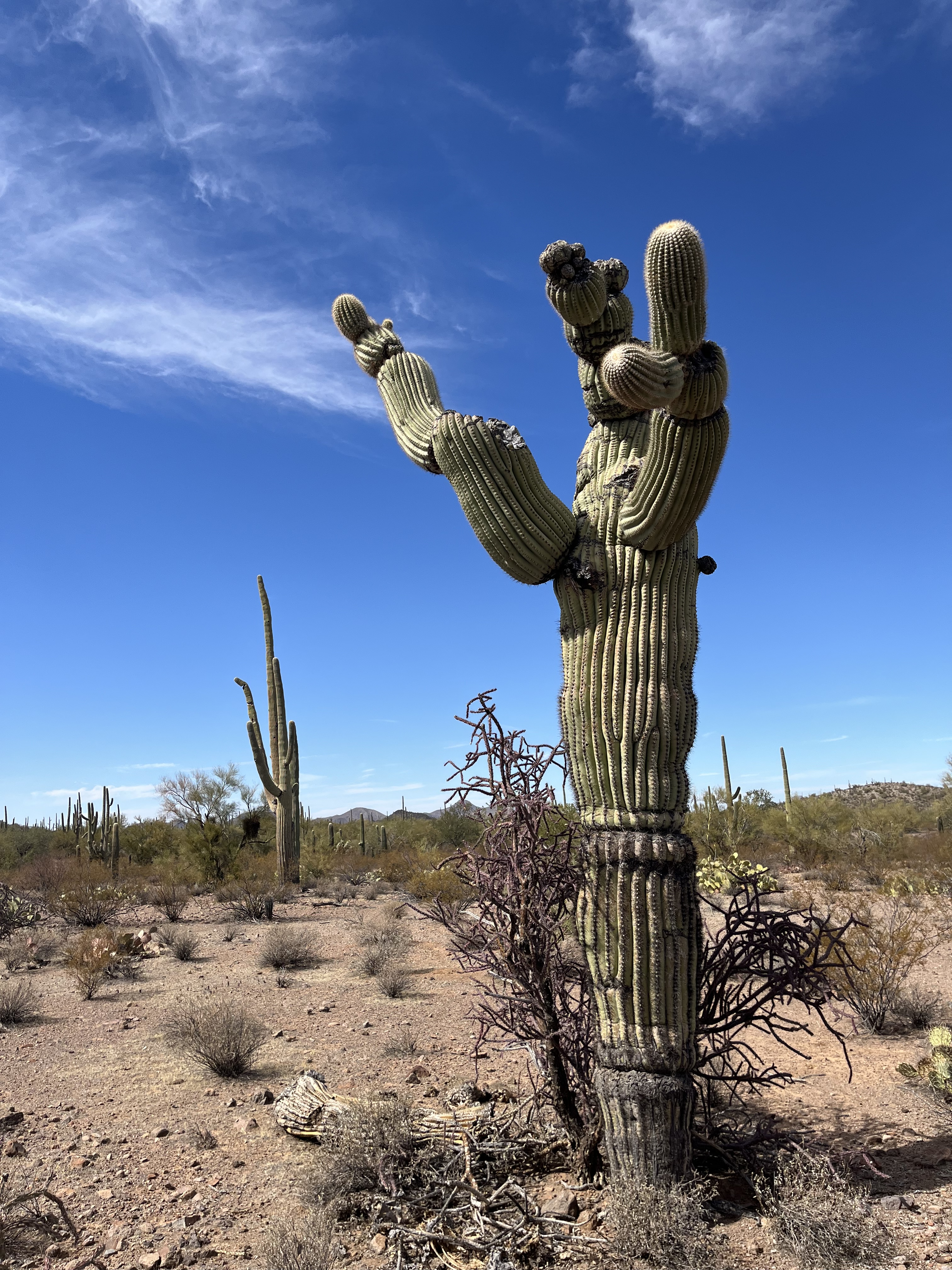
Sun salutations

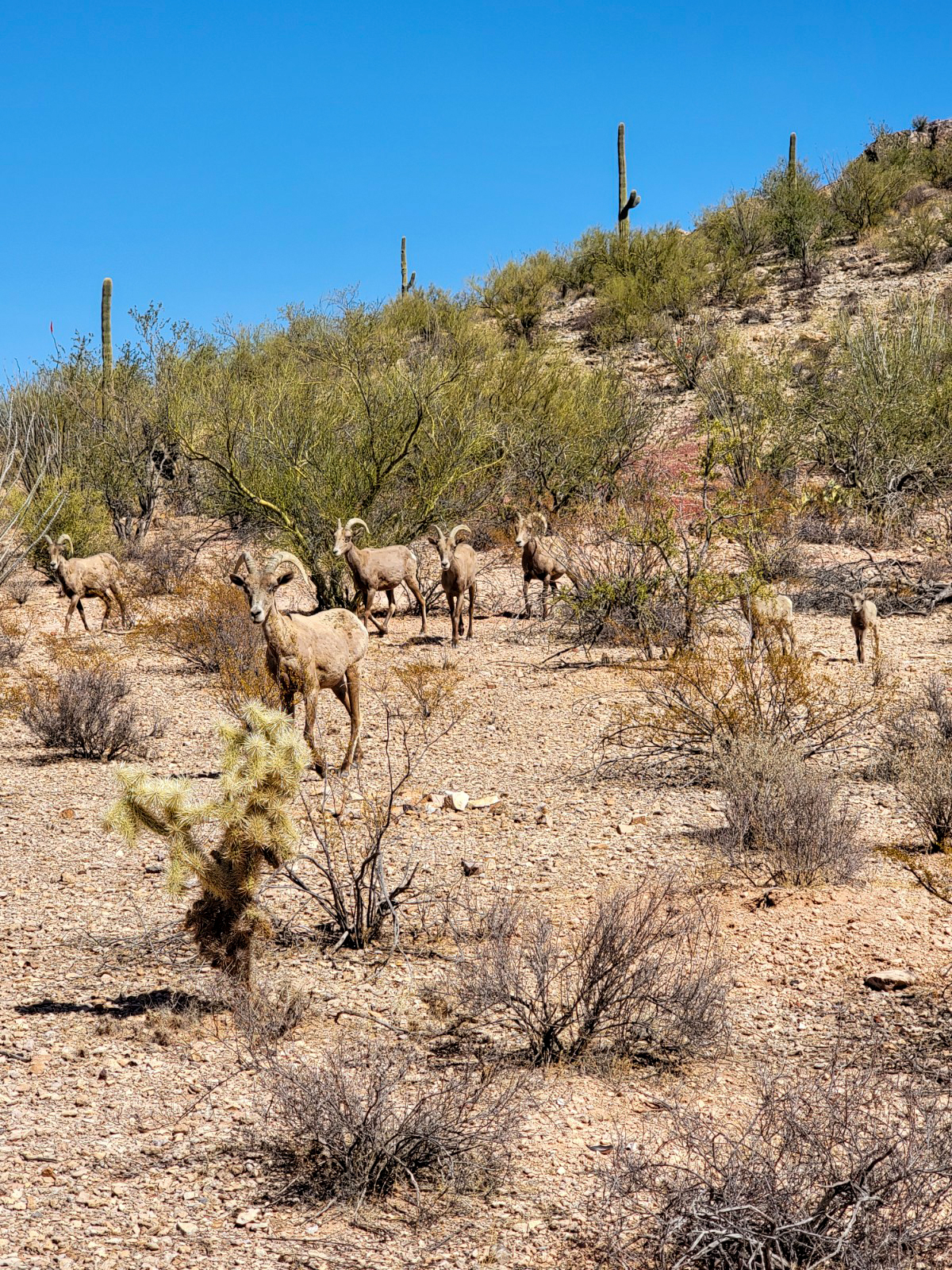
Bighorn sheep

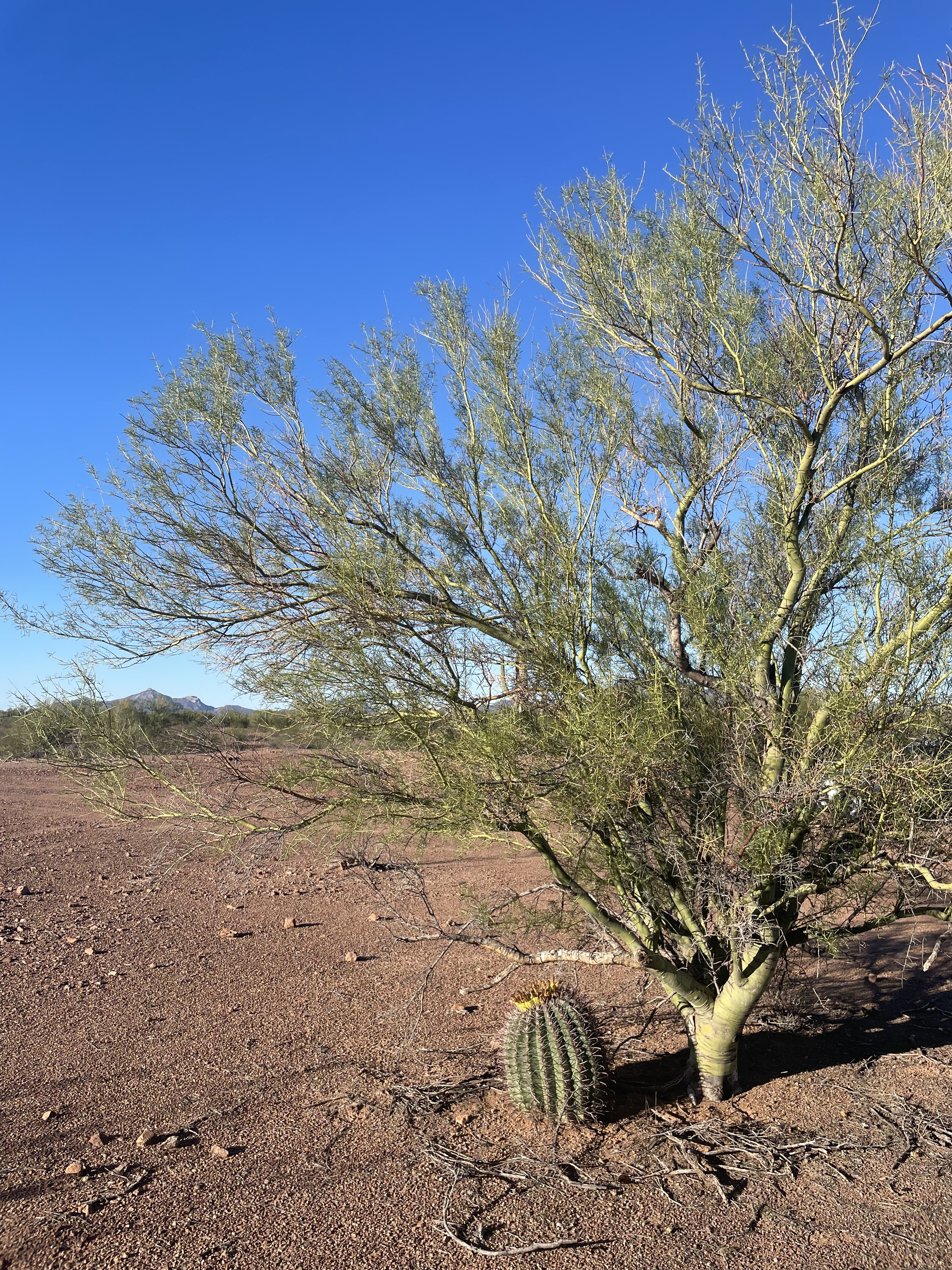
Fishhook cactus and Palo verde tree

== See also ==
- List of national monuments of the United States
- Silver Bell Mountains
- Waterman Mountains
- Saguaro National Park
- Tucson artifacts
