= Carnero =

Carnero or El Carnero may refer to:

== People with the surname ==
- Bernardo Martínez Carnero (1763–1833), Spanish bishop
- Carlos Carnero (born 1961), Spanish politician
- Diana Carnero (1995–2024), Ecuadorian politician
- Félix Carnero (born 1948), Spanish retired footballer
- Guillermo Carnero Hoke (1917–1985), Peruvian writer
- Jesús Julio Carnero (born 1964), Spanish politician
- María del Mar Rodríguez Carnero (born 1975), Spanish singer
- Ramón Carnero (born 1953), Spanish retired footballer

== Other uses ==
- El Carnero, a Spanish language colonial chronicle
- El Carnero, a place in Mexico where Laguna de Manialtepec opens to the sea

== See also ==
- Punta Carnero (disambiguation)
- Carnero Creek, in Arizona, U.S.
- Carnero Lake, in Arizona, U.S.
- Carnero Creek (Colorado), U.S.
- Carnero Pass, in Colorado, U.S.
- Los Carneros AVA, an American Viticultural Area
  - Domaine Carneros, a winery
