= Benny Creek =

Waterway in Apache County, Arizona

Coordinates: 34.0650°N 109.4565°W

Benny Creek is a stream in the U.S. state of Arizona. It is a tributary of Hall Creek.

Benny Creek has the name of Benny Howell, an early settler.

== Location and features ==
Benny Creek is a stream located in the White Mountains of eastern Arizona, within the Apache- Sitgreaves National Forests. It is a tributary of Hall Creek. The area features a ponderosa pine forest setting at an elevation of over 8,200 feet, and supports native fish species like speckled dace and bluehead sucker.

== See also ==
- List of rivers of Arizona
