= List of Grand Canyon rapids and features =

The following is a list of major rapids and other notable features on the Colorado River through Marble Canyon and Grand Canyon below Glen Canyon Dam, in order of their position downstream of Lee's Ferry. Ratings are given for how difficult the rapid is to navigate by whitewater raft or other water craft. The Grand Canyon section of the Colorado River, like several other big-water Western rivers, uses a rapids scale developed by Otis R. Marston of 1–10 for rapids, 10 being the most difficult. The International Scale of River Difficulty, which classifies rapids from class I to VI, is more common elsewhere in the US and internationally.

- Mile 0.0 – Lee's Ferry
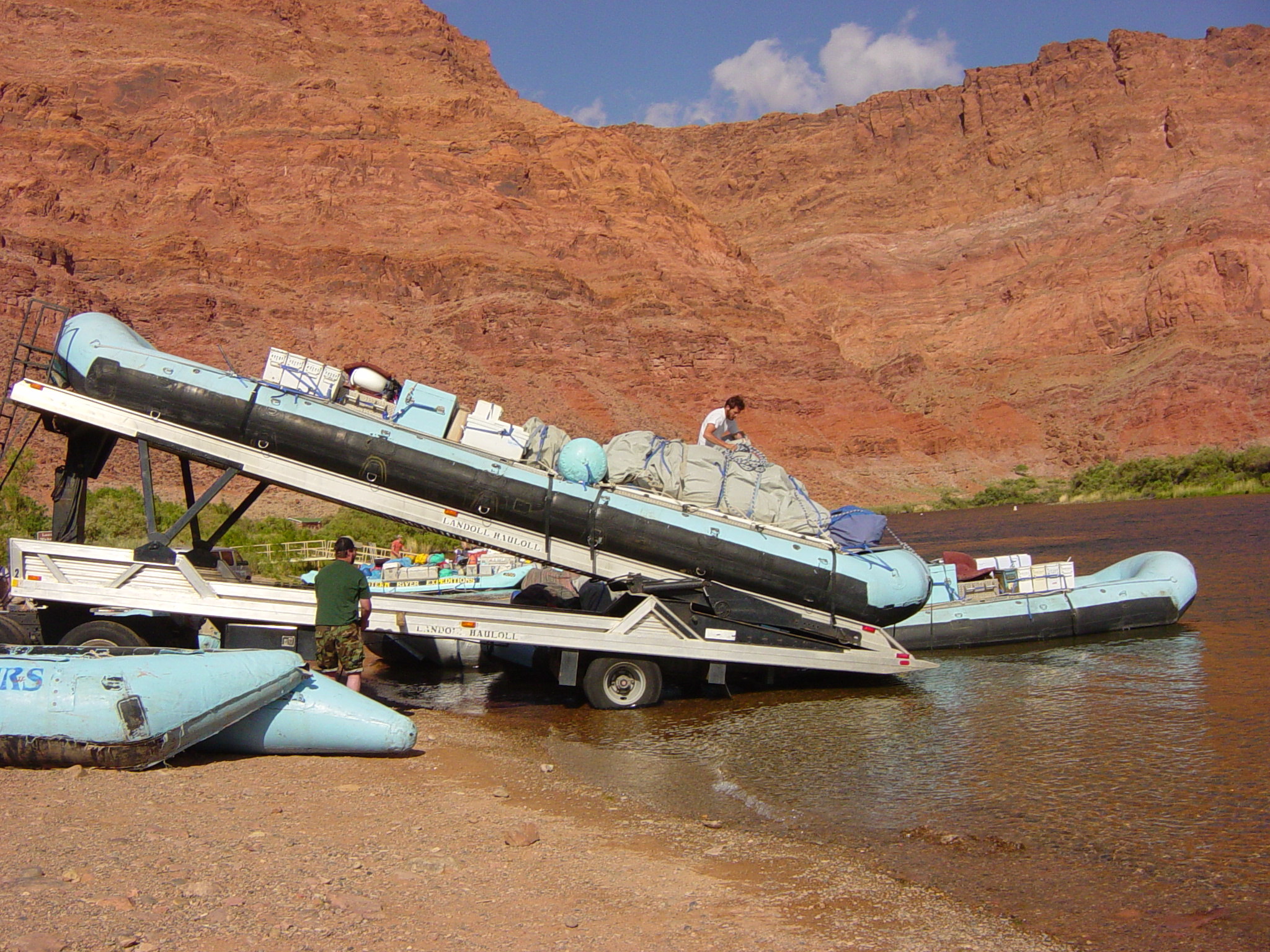
  A large raft is launched at Lee's Ferry (Mile 0.0)
- Mile 0.2 – Paria River Riffle (1)
- Mile 2.8 – Cathedral Wash (2)
- Mile 4.2 – Navajo Bridges
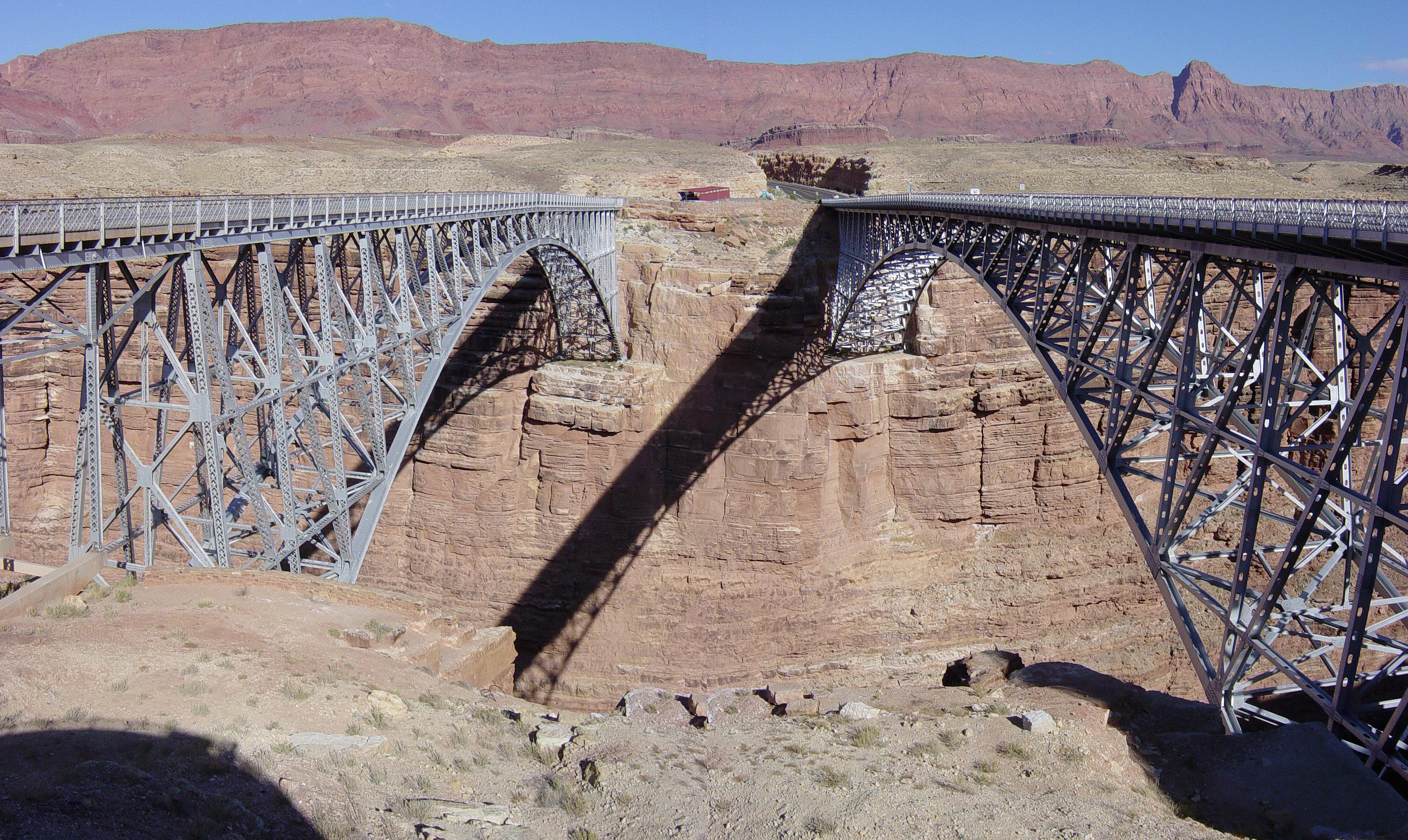
  Navajo Bridges (Mile 4.2)
- Mile 8.0 – Badger Creek Rapid (5) – First significant rapid in Marble Canyon with a large pour over in the center right.
- Mile 11.4 – Soap Creek Rapid (5)
- Mile 12.1 – Brown's Riffle (2) On July 9, 1889, the President of the Denver, Colorado Canyon and Pacific Railroad, Frank Mason Brown, drowned at this point when the boat he was in capsized. He was not wearing a life jacket.
- Mile 14.5 – Sheer Wall Rapid (2)
- Mile 17.1 – House Rock Rapid (7) – The first major rapid in Marble Canyon. A large hole on the left side of the river forms at most water levels, necessitating a right run.
- Mile 17.7 – Redneck Rapid (3)
- Mile 20.7 – North Canyon Rapid (5) (beginning of the "Roaring 20's")
- Mile 21.4 – 21 Mile Rapid (5)
- Mile 23.2 – 23 Mile Rapid (4) A sharp lateral on the right has flipped many a raft here.
- Mile 23.5 – 23.5 Mile Rapid (4)
- Mile 24.4 – 24 Mile (Georgie) Rapid (6)
- Mile 24.7 – 24.5 Mile Rapid (6) On July 8, 1949, 79-year-old Albert "Bert" Loper had a heart attack and died in this rapid while rowing his boat Grand Canyon.
- Mile 25.1 – 25 Mile (Hansbrough-Richards) Rapid (6) This rapid is named for two more men of the Brown Stanton expedition, Peter Hansbrough and Henry Richards, also not wearing life jackets, who drowned at this rapid on Monday, July 15, 1889.
- Mile 25.7 – Cave Springs Rapid (5)
- Mile 26.8 – 27 Mile (Tiger Wash) Rapid (5)
- Mile 29.4 – 29 Mile Rapid (2), Silver Grotto, and Shinumo Wash Camp
- Mile 30.4 – Fence Fault Rapid (3)
- Mile 31.8 – Nash's Riffle
- Mile 32.0 – Stanton's Cave
- Mile 32.2 – Vasey's Paradise
- Mile 33.2 – No rapid – site of the proposed Redwall Dam
- Mile 33.3 – Redwall Cavern – A very large alcove in the Redwall Sandstone at river level. Very popular stop for river trips.
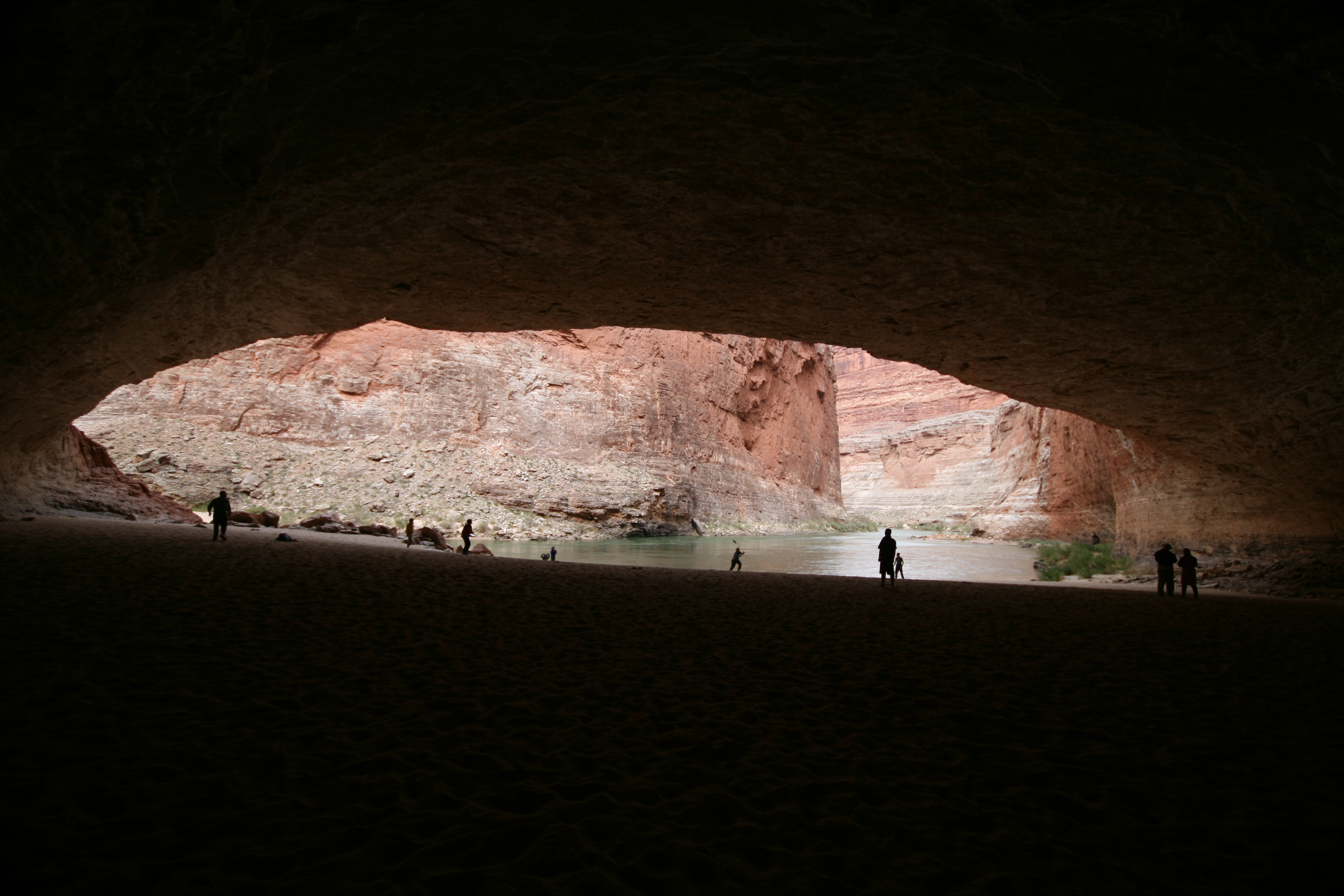
  Redwall Cavern (Mile 33.3)
- Mile 35.0 – Nautiloid Canyon
- Mile 36.0 – The Bridge of Sighs; this is one of the few Grand Canyon arches visible from the river.
- Mile 36.3 – 36 Mile Rapid (4)
- Mile 39.7 – No rapid – site of the proposed Marble Canyon Damsite.
- Mile 43.3 – Anasazi Bridge
- Mile 44.0 – President Harding Rapid (4) – The river splits around a large rock in the middle of the river.
- Mile 52.4 – Nankoweap Rapid (3)
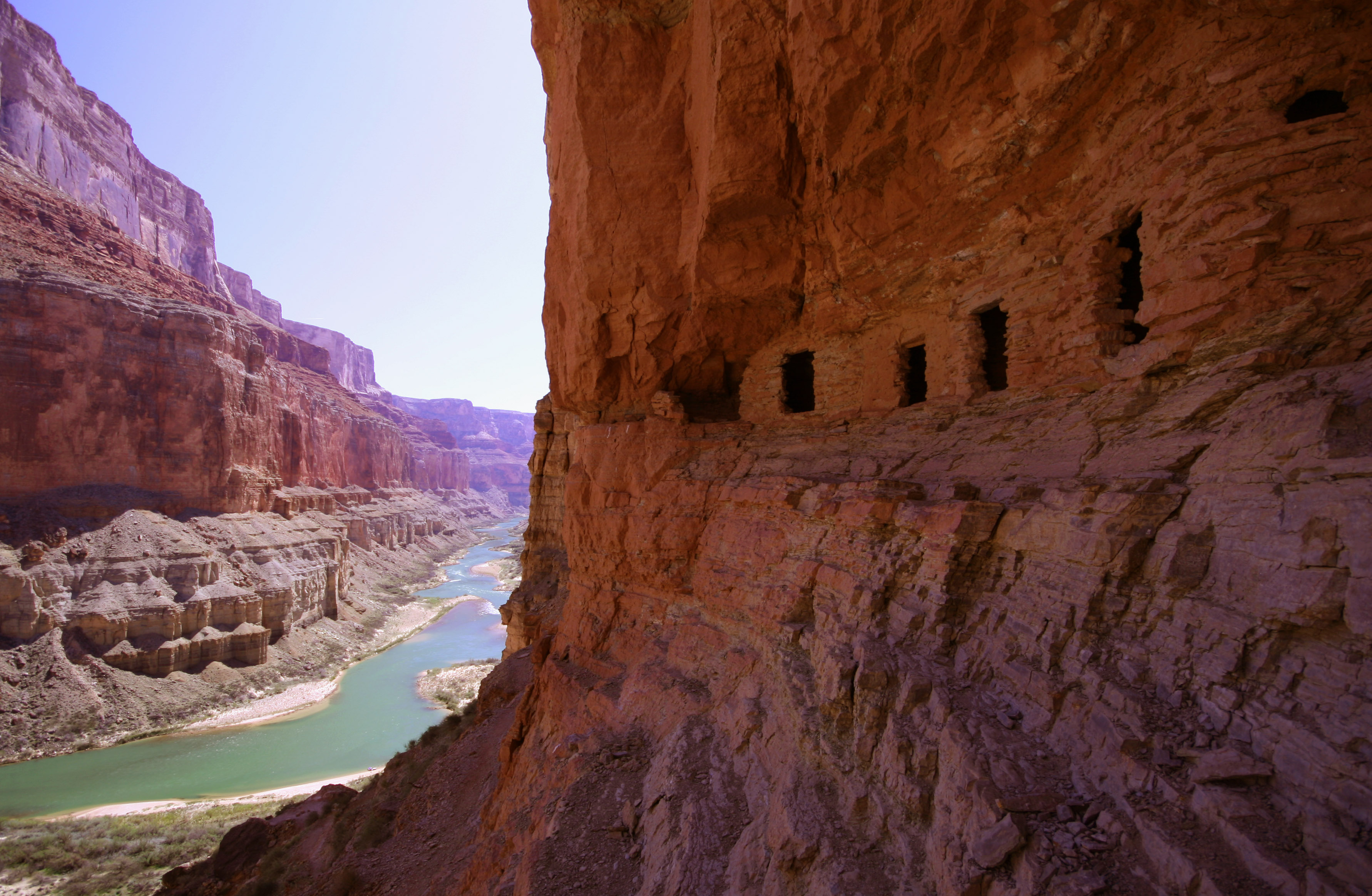
  Ancestral Puebloan granaries at Nankoweap Creek (Mile 52.4)
  - There are three popular campsites at Nankoweap for river trips. A steep trail up a nearby talus slope leads to Ancestral Puebloan granaries. This is also where the Nankoweap Trail reaches the river.
- Mile 56.3 – Kwagunt Rapid (5)
- Mile 60.1 – 60 Mile Rapid (4)
- Mile 61.7 – Little Colorado River Confluence.
- Mile 65.1 – Carbon Creek
- Mile 65.9 – Lava Canyon (Chuar) Rapid (4)
- Mile 69.0 – Tanner Rapid (6), terminus of the Tanner Trail and the Tanner Graben

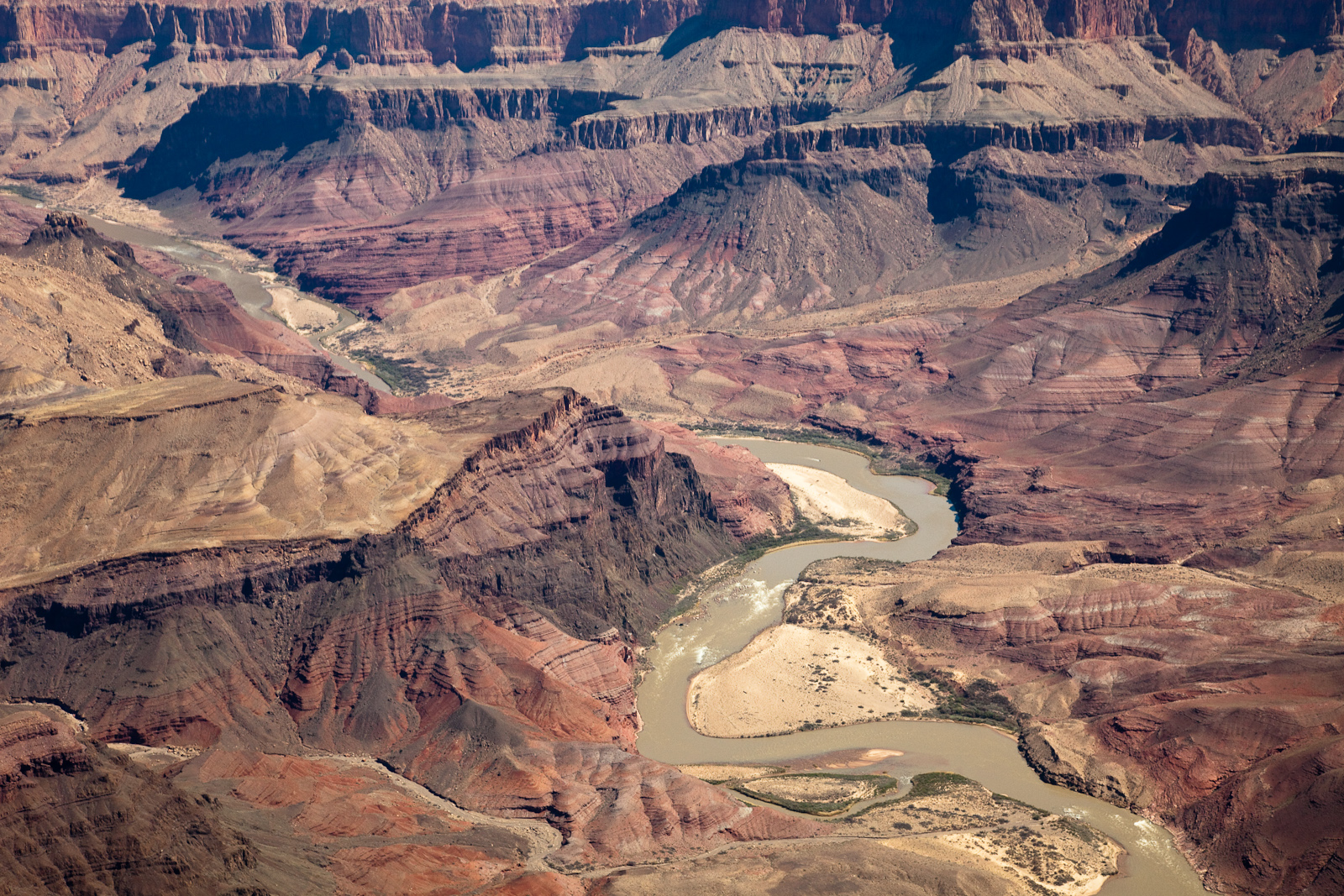
Outfall of Tanner Creek, then the (black) Tanner Graben, then Basalt Creek with Basalt Rapid (Mile 69.9)

- Mile 69.9 – Basalt Rapid (6) This rapid has a sharp pour-over on the left at low water.
- Mile 72.9 – Unkar Rapid (6)
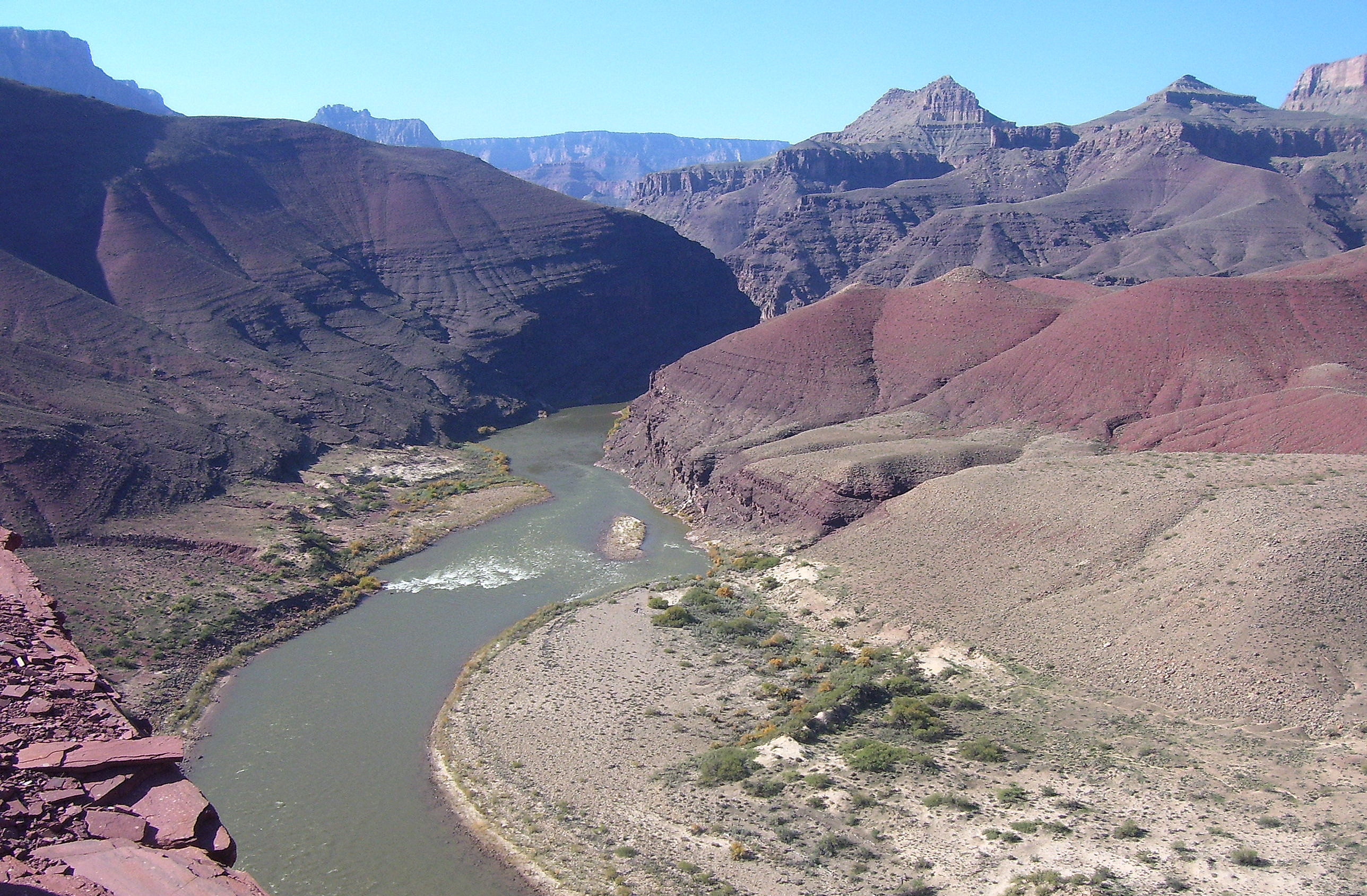
  The Colorado River near Unkar Rapid (Mile 72.9)
- Mile 73.6 – 73.6 Mile Riffle (4) This rapid has some exposed boulders on the left.
- Mile 75.3 – Escalante Creek Rapid (4)
- Mile 75.8 – 75 Mile (Nevills) Rapid (4)
- Mile 77.1 – Hance Rapid (8) – Multiple large rocks constrict the channel and form powerful hydraulics; terminus of the Hance Trail.
- Mile 79.1 – Sockdolager Rapid (7) – (Sockdolager is an archaic slang word for knockout blow.)
- Mile 82.1 – Grapevine Rapid (7)
- Mile 84.1 – 83 Mile Rapid (4)
- Mile 85.3 – Zoroaster Rapid (5)
- Mile 85.8 – 85 Mile Rapid (3)
- Mile 88.1 – Black Suspension Bridge (Kaibab Bridge) and Phantom Ranch boat beach, where the South Kaibab Trail crosses the river
- Mile 88.3 – Bright Angel Rapid (3), Bright Angel Creek and Bright Angel Bridge, where the River Trail begins
- Mile 89.5 – Pipe Creek Rapid (3), where the River Trail ends and continues towards the South Rim as the Bright Angel Trail
- Mile 90.8 – Horn Creek Rapid (8) – At lower water, forms very large waves and hydraulics and is one of the most difficult rapids in the canyon requiring a right to left downstream pull to miss a rock ledge on river right.
- Mile 93.1 – Salt Creek Rapid (3)
- Mile 93.9 – Granite Rapid (8) – One of the more difficult rapids with a strong push of hydraulics to the wall on river right.
- Mile 95.5 – Hermit Rapid (8) – Perhaps the strongest hydraulics and biggest waves in the canyon; terminus of the Hermit Trail

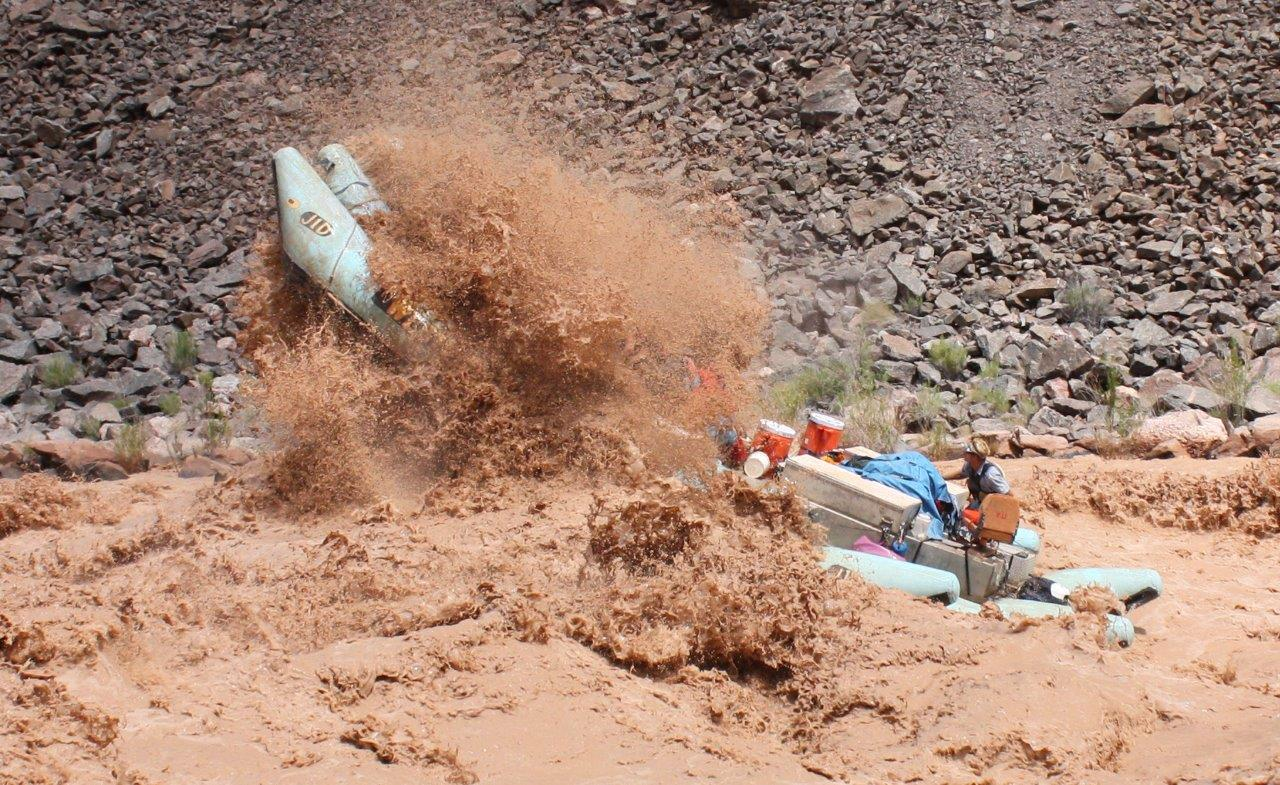
Motorized raft in Hermit Rapid (Mile 95.5)

- Mile 97.1 – Boucher Rapid (4)
- Mile 98.2 – Crystal Rapid (8) – Several very large holes followed by a dangerous rock garden at bottom of rapids in mid channel. Formed in 1966 when a flash flood of Crystal Canyon washed debris into the river. The beginning of a series of rapids called "the gems."

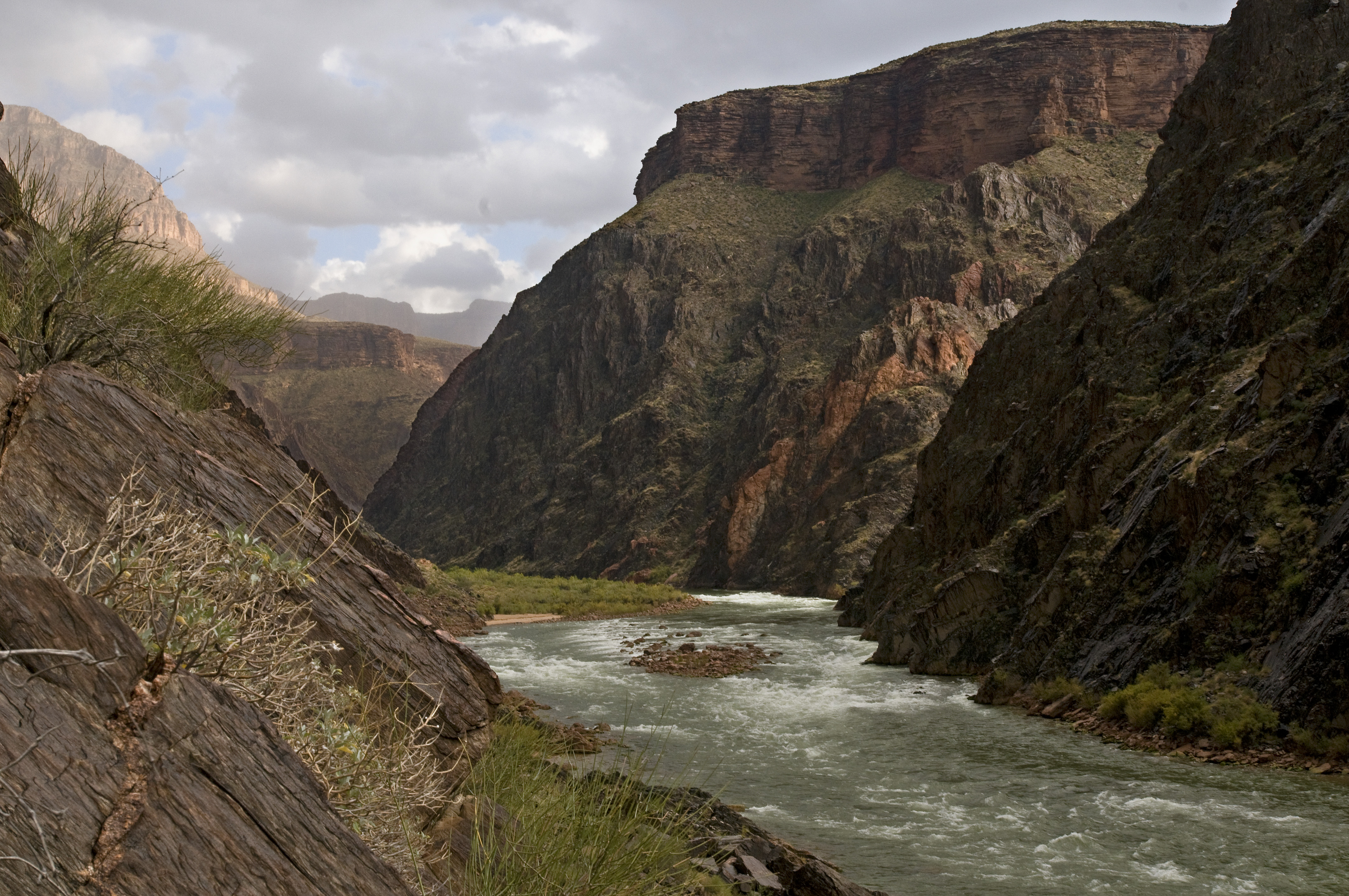
Crystal Rapid (Mile 98.2)

- Mile 99.7 – Tuna Creek Rapid (6)
- Mile 100.0 – Lower Tuna (Willie's Necktie) Rapid (4)
- Mile 100.4 – Nixon Rock Rapid (3) – This just right of center boulder can be passed on the right or the left.
- Mile 101.1 – Agate Rapid (3)
- Mile 101.8 – Sapphire Rapid (7)
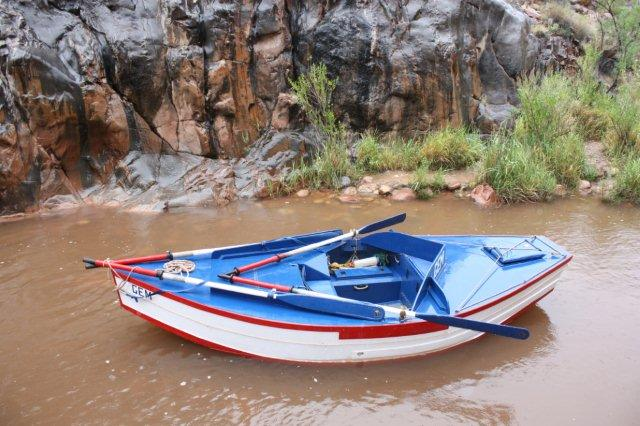
  Dory in the mouth of Shinumo Creek (Mile 109.3)
- Mile 102.6 – Turquoise Rapid (3)
- Mile 104.5 – Emerald Rapid (5)
- Mile 105.2 – Ruby Rapid (5)
- Mile 106.5 – Serpentine Rapid (7)
- Mile 108.3 – Beach and trailhead for the South Bass Trail.
- Mile 108.4 – Bass Rapid (4)
- Mile 109.3 – Shinumo Rapid (4)
- Mile 109.6 – 109 Mile Rapid (2) This sleeper of a rapid has sharp schist fins on river right.
- Mile 110.0 – 110 Mile Rapid (3)
- Mile 111.4 – Hakatai Rapid (4)
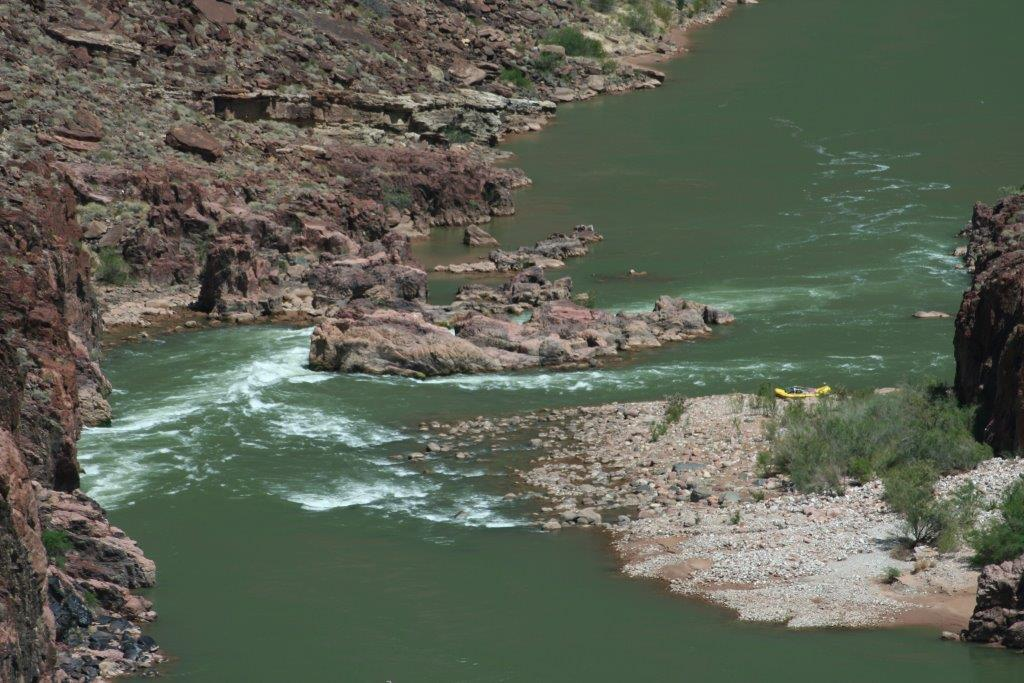
  Looking downstream to Bedrock Rapid (Mile 131.1)
- Mile 112.8 – Walthenberg Rapid (6)
- Mile 113.6 – 113 Mile Rock (2)
- Mile 117.2 – Elves Chasm – A popular side canyon with a small clear-flowing stream with waterfalls and multiple pools.
- Mile 119.3 – 119 Mile Rapid (2)
- Mile 120.6 – Blacktail Rapid (3)
- Mile 122.2 – Mile 122 Rapid (4)
- Mile 123.3 – Forster Rapid (5)
- Mile 124.1 – 124.1 Mile Rapid (3)
- Mile 125.0 – 125 Mile Rapid (3)
- Mile 125.5 – Fossil Rapid (5)
- Mile 126.4 – 126.4 Mile Rapid (3)
- Mile 127.5 – 127 Mile Rapid (3)
- Mile 129.2 – 128 Mile Rapid (4)
- Mile 129.7 – Specter Rapid (6)
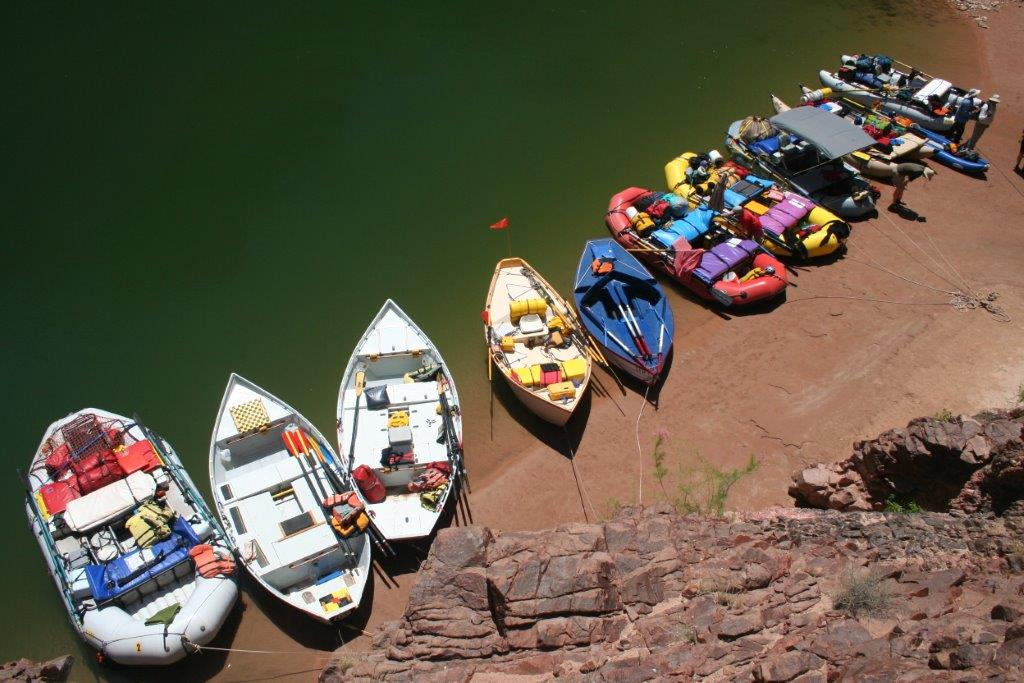
  River boats at Deer Creek Falls (Mile 136.9)
- Mile 131.1 – Bedrock Rapid (7) – The river splits around a very large rock outcropping. Going left of the rock is not recommended.
- Mile 132.3 – Deubendorff Rapid (7) – Has multiple large holes and pourovers on the left and center
- Mile 134.3 – Tapeats Creek – A large creek entering at river right. A popular hike up Tapeats Creek leads to Thunder River.
- Mile 134.3 – Tapeats Rapid (5)
- Mile 135.4 – 135 Mile (Helicopter Eddy) Rapid (3)
- Mile 135.6 – Granite Narrows. This is the narrowest location of the river at 76 feet.
- Mile 136.9 – Deer Creek Falls – A popular stop, both for the falls themselves and for hikes up to the "narrows" and the "throne room."
- Mile 138.4 – Doris Rapid (4)
- Mile 139.2 – 138.5 Mile Rapid (3)
- Mile 139.7 – Fishtail Rapid (4)
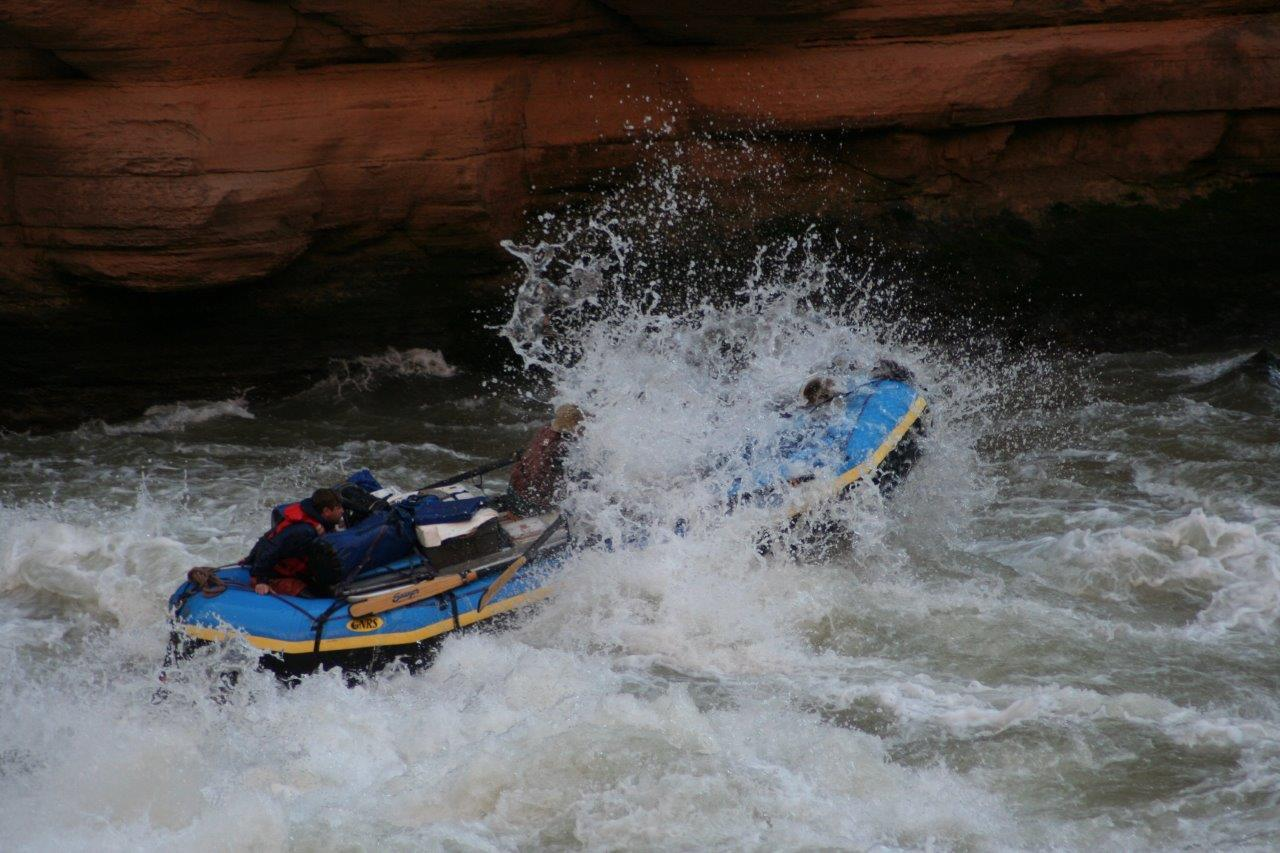
  The left run at Upset Rapid (Mile 150.2)
- Mile 141.7 – 141 Mile Rapid (2)
- Mile 144.0 – Kanab Rapid (3)
- Mile 148.4 – Matkatamiba Rapid (2) Matkatamiba Canyon is a popular, short hike up a narrow, winding slot canyon with a perennial stream.
- Mile 150.2 – Upset Rapid (8)
- Mile 154.0 – Sinyala Rapid (2)
- Mile 157.3 – Havasu Canyon is a beautiful turquoise-watered side canyon. Havasu Canyon Rapid (3) follows immediately downstream.
- Mile 165.0 – 164 Mile Rapid (2)
- Mile 167.0 – National Rapid (2)
- Mile 168.5 – Fern Glen Rapid (2)
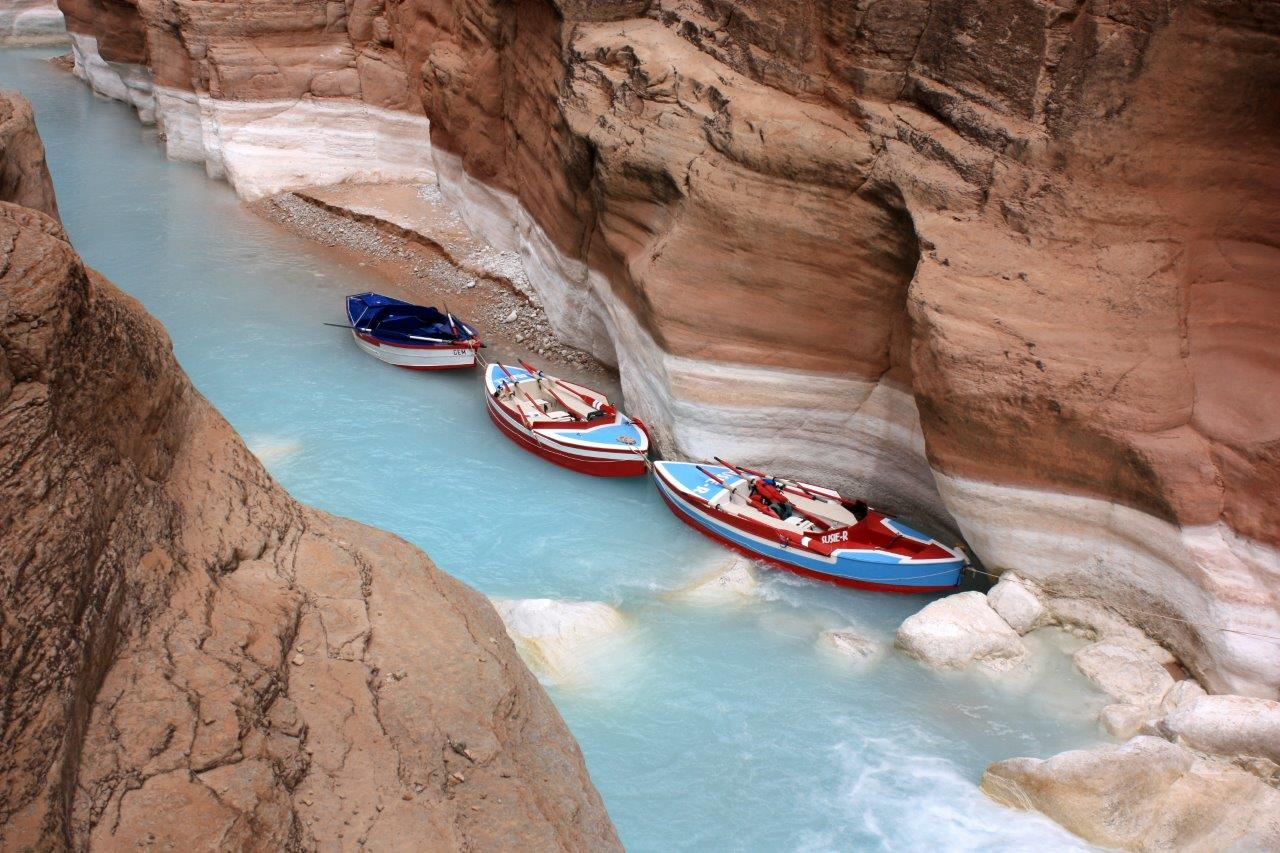
  1950's replica dories at Havasu Canyon (Mile 157.3)
- Mile 171.9 – Gateway Rapid (3)
- Mile 179.7 – Lava Falls Rapid (9) – Also known as Vulcan Rapid, is perhaps the most difficult, if short, run in the entire canyon. It is on the east edge of the Uinkaret volcanic field.
- Mile 180.1 – Lower Lava Rapid (4)
- Mile 186.0 – 185 Mile Rapid (2)
- Mile 187.4 – Whitmore Helipad is where most concessions passengers end their trip by helicopter take-out.
- Mile 188.3 – Whitmore Rapid (3)
- Mile 205.6 – 205 Mile (Kolb) Rapid (6)
- Mile 209.2 – 209 Mile Rapid (5) This rapid has a large hole in the middle of the rapid.
- Mile 212.5 – Little Bastard (LB) Rapid (3)
- Mile 213.3 – Pumpkin Spring
- Mile 216.0 – Three Springs Rapid (2)
- Mile 217.8 – 217 Mile Rapid (5)
- Mile 219.6 – Trail Canyon (Ducky Eater) Rapid (2) Cross-river hydraulics can flip small inflatable kayaks here.
- Mile 220.7 – Granite Spring Rapid (2)
- Mile 223.7 – 224 Mile Rapid (3)
- Mile 225.9 – Diamond Creek Take-out/Put-in. This is the first location downriver from Lee's Ferry where a road reaches the Colorado River. The road is prone to flash flood by Diamond Creek in monsoon season. This is the only takeout for Grand Canyon boating trips above Lake Mead when the lake is high, however, recently the lake has been lower, allowing the Colorado River to flow all the way past the take out at Pearce Ferry, Lake Mead.
- Mile 225.9 – Diamond Creek Rapid (4)
- Mile 228.2 – 228.2 Mile Rapid (3)
- Mile 229.3 – Travertine Rapid (2)
- Mile 231.2 – 231 Mile Rapid (5)
- Mile 232.5 – 232 Mile (Killer Fang Falls) Rapid (4–7) – Bessie Hyde of the 1928 Disappearance of Glen and Bessie Hyde wrote in her journal up to this rapid. Her journal was located in her abandoned sweep scow below this rapid.
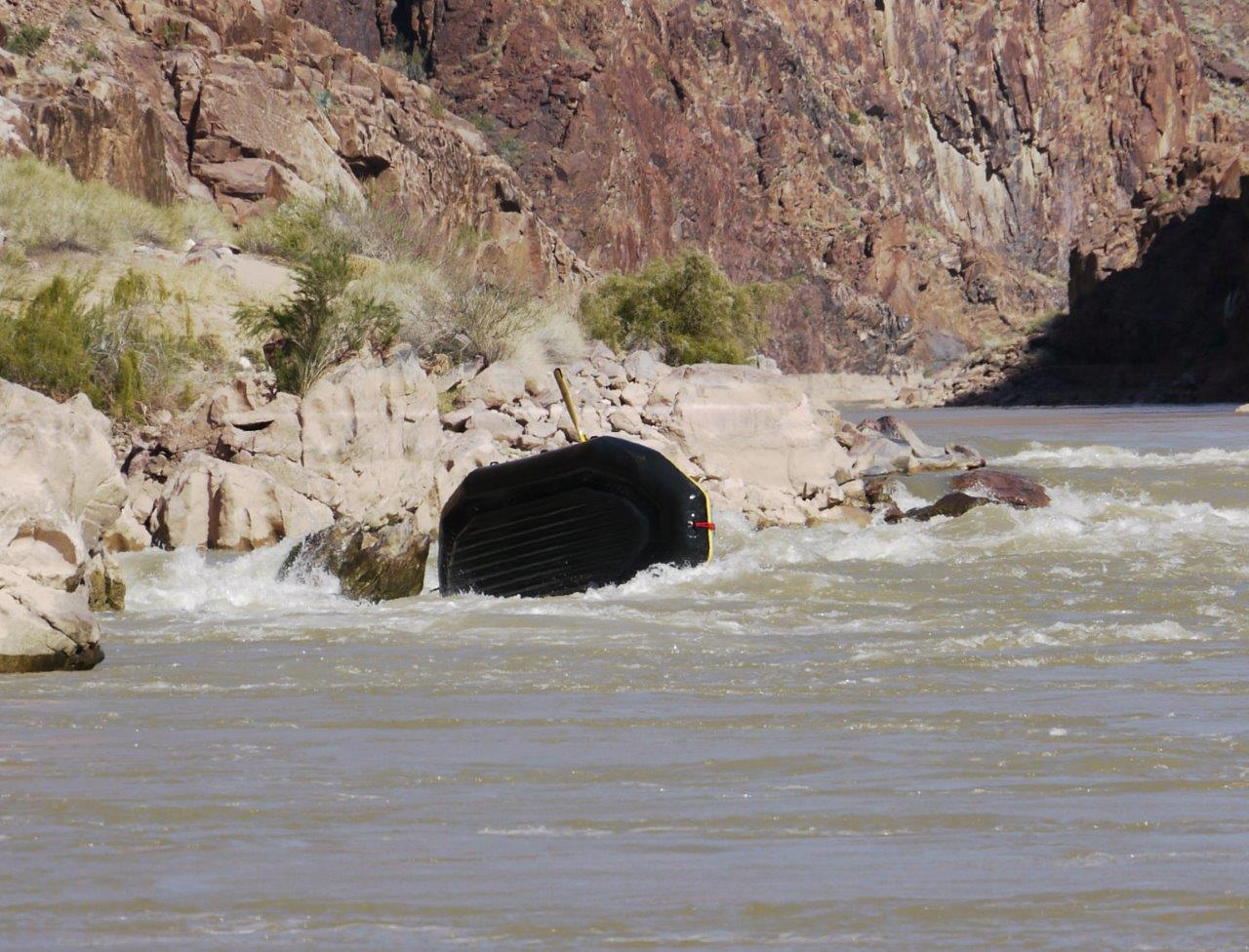
  18 foot long raft flips at Killer Fang Falls (Mile 232.3)
- Mile 233.9 – 234 Mile Rapid (5)
- Mile 235.3 – Bridge Canyon Rapid (4)
- Mile 236.0 – Gneiss Canyon Rapid (5)
- Mile 239.5 – Separation Rapid (1)
- Mile 280.5 – Pearce Ferry Take-out at Pearce Ferry, Lake Mead, is the first take-out point for river trips traveling through the entire Grand Canyon. This Take-Out (on Lake Mead) has been recently renovated, making it operational at low reservoir levels. With the appearance of Pearce Ferry Rapid, this take-out has become preferred, as the rapid just below is often considered unrunnable, though this is always changing.
- Mile 280.8 – Pearce Ferry Rapid (unrunnable; class VI on the International Scale of River Difficulty) This rapid was created in 2007 when the level of Lake Mead went below 1138 feet. Lake Mead was over 70 feet deep here in 2000. This rapid is formed by the Colorado River running full force into a hillside. It is a must-scout for any river runners continuing to the next take-out on Lake Mead at South Cove. It is currently considered to be unrunnable.
- Mile 297 – South Cove Take-Out (in Lake Mead)

== Sources ==
- Mile 239.5 – Separation Canyon – Northern Arizona University Library, http://archive.library.nau.edu/digital/collection/cpa/id/22296/
- Guide to the Colorado River in the Grand Canyon, Eighth Edition, 2021, Tom Martin and Duwain Whitis, Vishnu Temple Press and RiverMaps. ISBN 978-1-7324017-4-7
- "Belknap's Waterproof Grand Canyon River Guide"; New Edition 2009; Buzz Belnap—Loie Belknap Evans; Library of Congress Control Number: 2006937059; ISBN 978-0-916370-16-9
- "From Powell To Power; A Recounting of the First One Hundred River Runners Through the Grand Canyon. 2014, Otis "Dock" Marston, Vishnu Temple Press, Flagstaff, Arizona. ISBN 978-0990527022
