= Hockey Puck Spring =

Waterbody in Coconino County, Arizona

Coordinates: 35.9338°N 113.1765°W

Hockey Puck Spring is a spring in Coconino County, Arizona, in the United States.

Hockey Puck is a corruption of a Hualapai word.

== See also ==
- List of rivers of Arizona
