= Sabino Canyon =

Landform in Pima County, Arizona

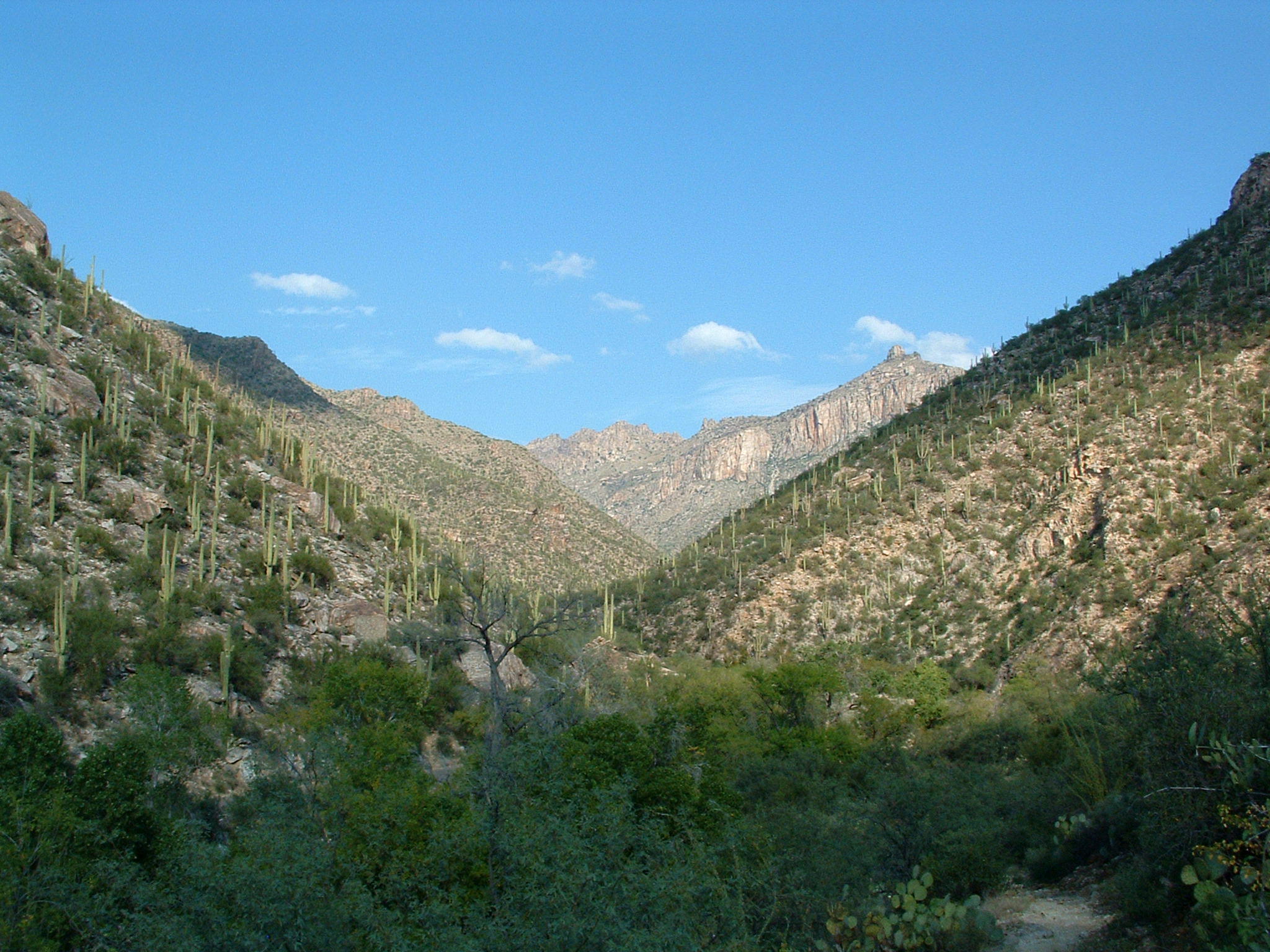
- The canyon in 2002

- Location within Arizona

Geography
- Location: Santa Catalina Mountains, Arizona, United States
- Coordinates: 32°19′20.52″N 110°48′35.36″W
- Topo map: Sabino Canyon, AZ
- Rivers: Sabino Creek
- Interactive map of Sabino Canyon

Sabino Canyon is a significant canyon located in the Santa Catalina Mountains and the Coronado National Forest north of Tucson, Arizona, United States. Sabino Canyon is a popular recreation area for residents and visitors of Southern Arizona, providing a place to walk, hike or ride. Minutes away from the desert are large waterfalls along Sabino Creek with minor bridges constructed over them. Wildlife in the canyon includes a range of animals. Some of which are deer, javelina, skunks, tortoises, rattlesnakes and mountain lions. Like most places in Arizona, there are also owls, and scorpion which are very common in Tucson hiking trails.

== History and formation ==
The history of Sabino Canyon began with the formation of the Santa Catalina Mountains over 12 million years ago. Around 5 million B.C., the mountains ceased formation around the Tucson valley. Present-day varieties of plant life first appeared between 6,000 and 8,000 years ago, and some of the earliest human occupants of Sabino Canyon were the Native American Hohokam people.

The 1887 Sonora earthquake dislodged massive boulders lining the canyon walls, which came to rest in the valley below. In 1905 the newly created U.S. Forest Service began administering Sabino Canyon. During the Great Depression, the Works Progress Administration (WPA) and Emergency Relief Administration (ERA) built Sabino Dam and nine bridges over Sabino Creek in an attempt to build a road to the top of Mount Lemmon. The road travels about 4.5 mi (7.2 km) into the canyon, but was not completed due to the steep terrain at the end of the canyon.

== Shuttle ==
The first Shuttle in Sabino Canyon began operating in October, 1978. From that point forward, access by cars was restricted to allow visitors to reach Upper Sabino Canyon by foot, bicycle or Shuttle. Sabino Canyon Tours was founded in May 1985 and provides visitors the opportunity to experience the noted beauty of Sabino Canyon. The Shuttle was cancelled by the US government in 2018 and reopened in March 2019, with closed-in electric shuttlebuses set to replace the former open scenic Shuttles. Summer/Fall 2019 is expected to see the return of new open scenic Shuttle all electrically powered.

== Flooding ==
On July 31, 2006, flooding from a thunderstorm washed out the bridge at Rattlesnake Creek (just beyond mile marker 1 and shuttle stop #1), restricting the tram to the road below this point. Many portions of the roadway above Rattlesnake Creek also received damage from the flooding, including silt and debris scattered onto it. Tram service was completely restored, with the tram being able to complete all nine stops.

== Funding ==
Federal funding has increasingly not kept pace with the pressures that urbanization and over a million visitors a year have placed on Sabino Canyon. Friends of Sabino Canyon, an independent non-profit organization, was founded in 1993 to raise additional funds to preserve and enhance Sabino Canyon.

Friends of Sabino Canyon has provided nearly $500,000 for projects in Sabino Canyon, including trail rehabilitation in the aftermath of the Aspen Fire, a water well, educational exhibits in the visitor center, new entrance plaza facilities, research into bats, amphibians and reptiles, and the restoration of the original Lowell House Ranger Station and the historic depression-era bridges and other stonework.

Friends of Sabino Canyon holds an outdoor holiday concert, Music in the Canyon, every year to raise funds for its work, and its major donors are recognized on hand-painted tiles at the entrance to Sabino Canyon, reflecting a variety of southwestern themes.

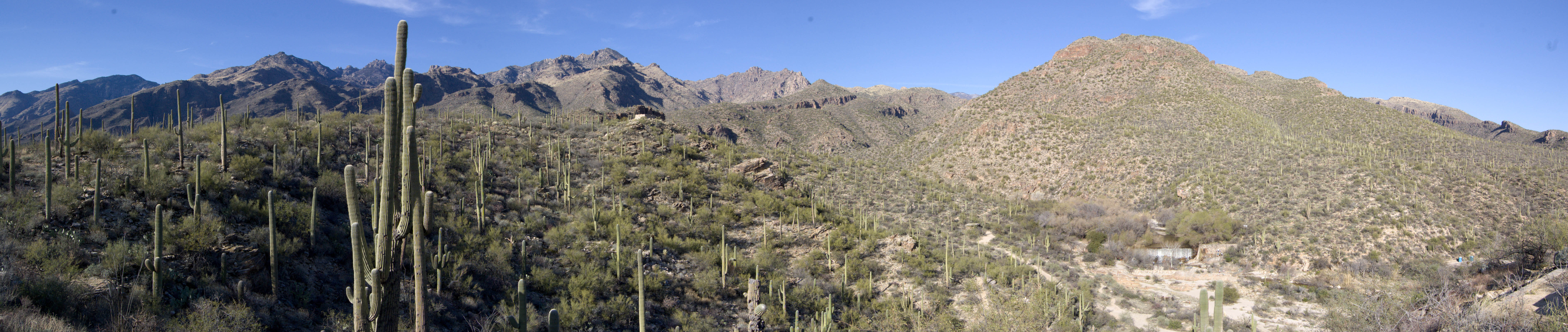
Panorama looking toward Sabino Canyon in February 2009

== Gallery ==
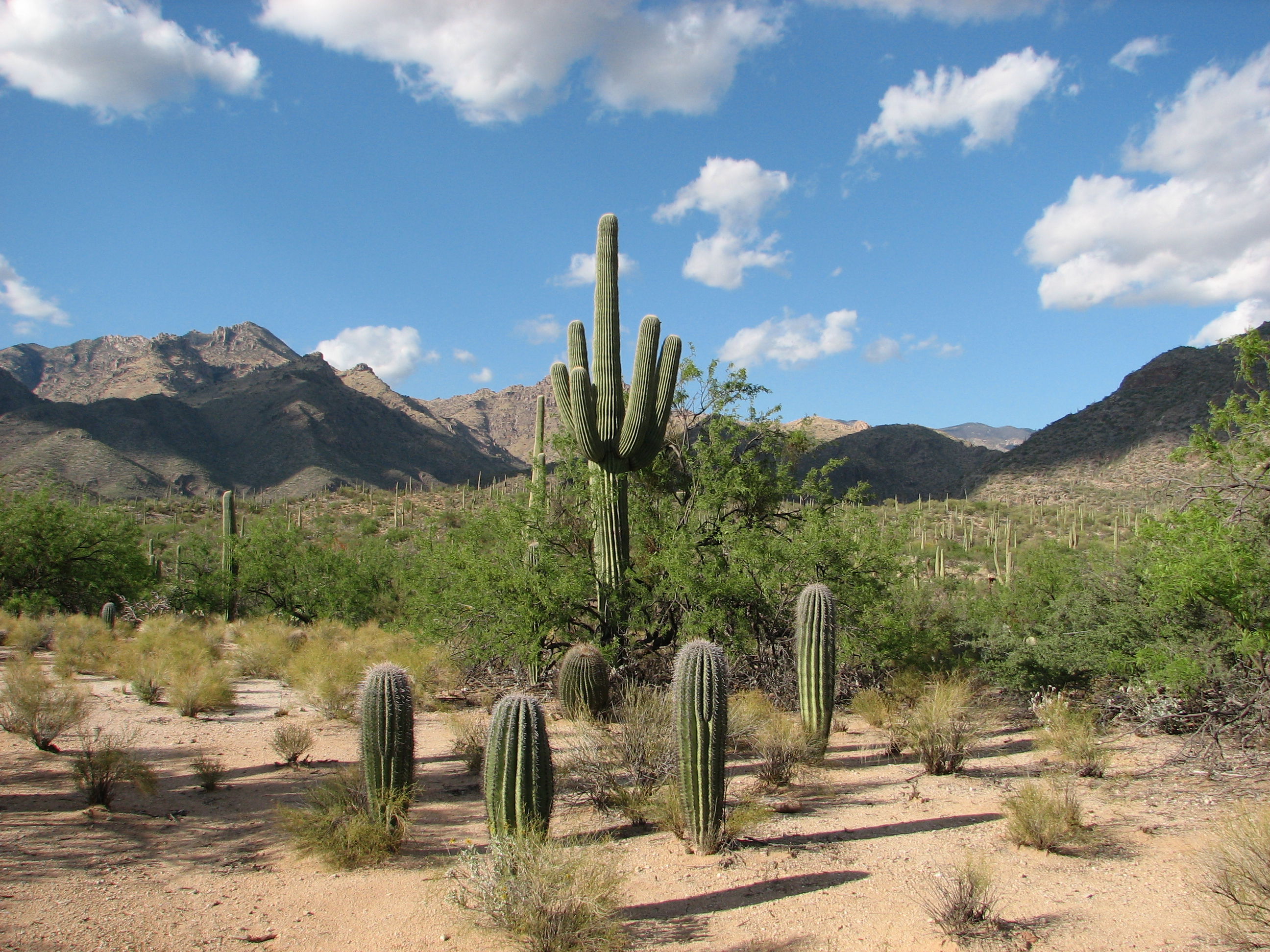
Bear Canyon Trail

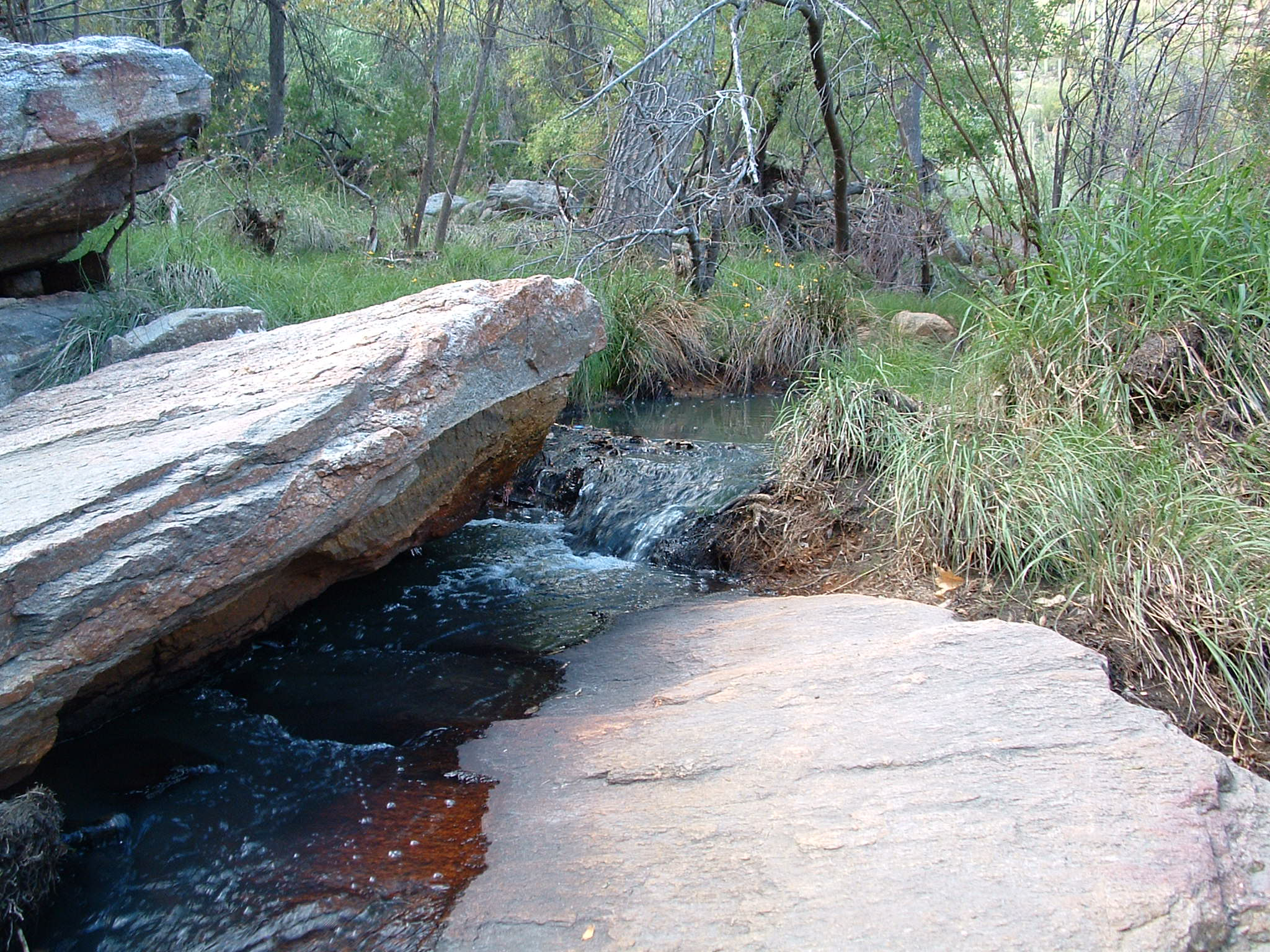
Sabino Creek

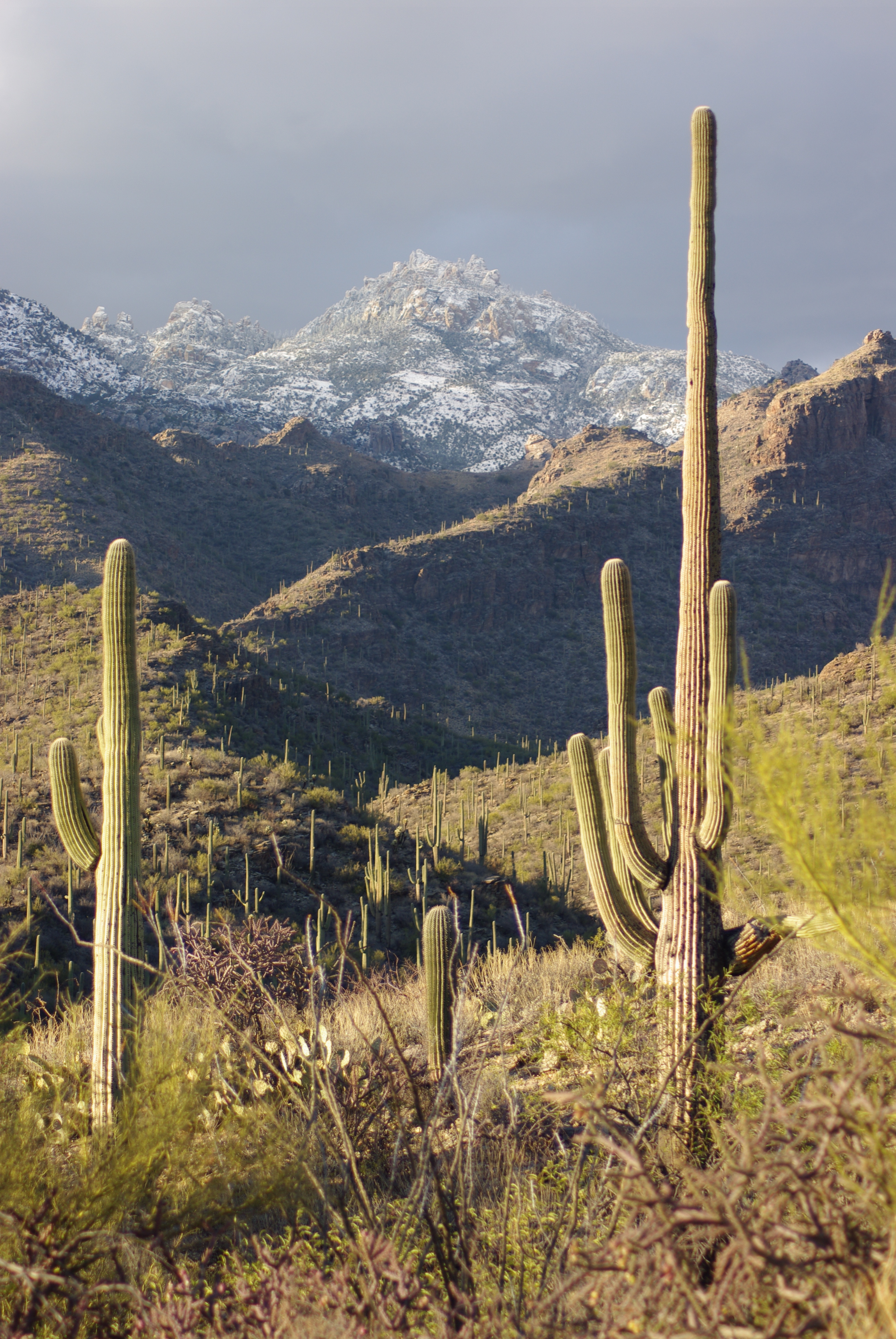
Sabino Canyon in winter

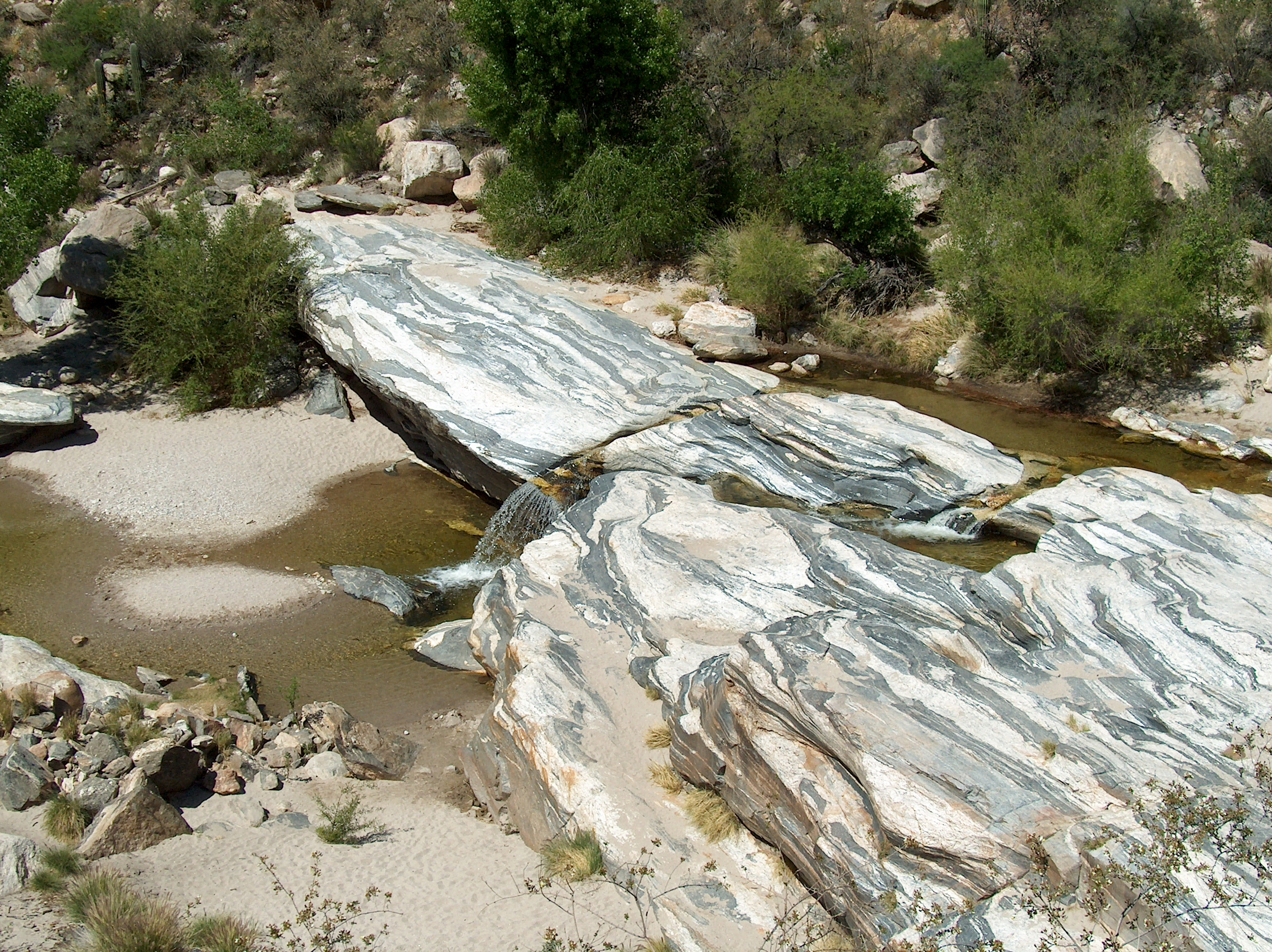
Sabino Creek passing over striated rock formation

== See also ==
- Sabino High School
- Molino Canyon
- List of rivers of Arizona
