= Eagle Creek (Arizona) =

Stream in Greenlee County, Arizona

Coordinates: 32.9600631°N 109.4061844°W

Location
- Country: United States
- State: Arizona

Physical characteristics
- Source
  - location: Spring (hydrosphere)
  - elevation: 3,000 ft (910 m)
- Mouth
  - location: Gila River

Eagle Creek is a 58.5-mile-long (94.1 km) river located 50 miles (80 km) northwest of Clifton, Arizona, United States, at the base of the White Mountain Range. It is a tributary of the Gila River.

== Fish species ==
- Smallmouth bass
- Channel catfish
- Flathead catfish
- Apache trout
- Carp

== Coordinates ==
- Latitude: 33°10'17.28"N
- Longitude: 109°29'55.22"W

== See also ==
- List of rivers of Arizona
