= Silver Creek (Arizona) =

Waterway in Navajo County, Arizona

Coordinates: 34.3400403°N 109.9495541°W

Silver Creek (Upper)

Location
- Country: United States
- State: Arizona

Physical characteristics
- Source
  - elevation: 6,100 ft (1,900 m) above sea level
- Length: 45 mi (72 km)

Silver Creek is a 45-mile-long (72 km) stream located in the White Mountains of Arizona north of Show Low. It is a tributary of the Little Colorado River.

== Fish species ==
- Rainbow trout
- Brown trout

== See also ==
- List of rivers of Arizona
