= Carnero Lake =

Lake in Apache County, Arizona

- Location within Arizona Location within the United States
- Location: Apache County, Arizona
- Coordinates: 34°7′0.15″N 109°31′41.21″W
- Basin countries: United States
- Surface area: 65 acres (26 ha)
- Average depth: 6 ft (1.8 m)
- Max. depth: 10 ft (3.0 m)
- Surface elevation: 9,033 ft (2,753 m)

Carnero Lake is a high elevation shallow lake in Apache County, Arizona. Built in 1979, the lake quickly became popular with anglers, to the dismay of downstream water users. Because of the dispute, the Arizona Game and Fish discontinued stocking for many years. In 1999, the Arizona Game and Fish has acquired a major share of the water rights, setting the stage for a new and vigorous trout fishery.

== Location ==
Carnero Lake is located at 9,033 feet (2,753 m) on the Apache-Sitgreaves National Forests. Due to snow and ice, these roads are typically closed from mid-November to mid-April.

== Description ==
Carnero Lake is a shallow 65-acre (26 ha) headwater impoundment of Carnero Creek. It has a maximum depth of ten feet. It's quite weedy, which is problematic for fishing, but is also an indicator of a highly productive lake. It's stocked with catchable-sized and smaller-than-catchable rainbow trout and tiger trout in the spring. Because it's at high elevation and shallow, it's subject to periodic winter kills.

== Fish species ==
- Rainbow trout
- Tiger trout

== See also ==
- White Mountain Grasslands Wildlife Area
