= Molino Canyon =

Valley in Pima County, Arizona

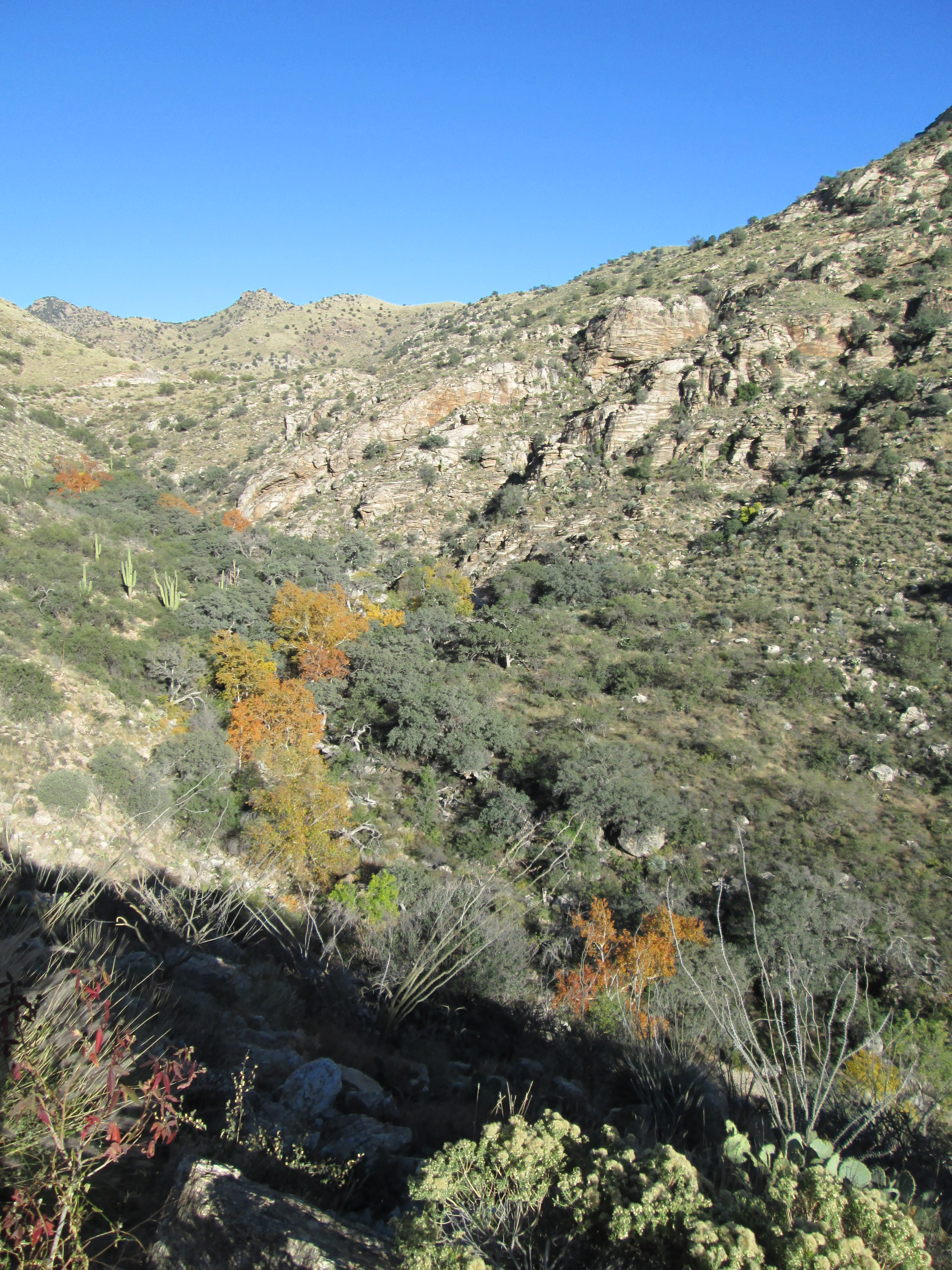
- Molino Canyon, facing northeast from Catalina Highway

- Location within Arizona

Geography
- Location: Santa Catalina Mountains, Arizona, United States
- Coordinates: 32°18′07″N 110°43′04″W GNIS data
- Topo map: Agua Caliente Hill, AZ
- Rivers: Molino Creek
- Interactive map of Molino Canyon

Molino Canyon is a steep-sided, boulder-strewn canyon in the Santa Catalina Mountains northeast of Tucson, Arizona, next to the Molino Basin Campground. The canyon is located within the Coronado National Forest, and encompasses a wide variety of flora and fauna, ranging from lush pine forest in the canyon's upper reaches to Sonoran Desert cactus forest in the lower reaches. Catalina Highway was cut into the western side of the lower part of the canyon.

At the bottom of Molino Canyon is Molino Creek, a seasonal stream that flows southwest over large granite outcroppings, forming a series of small waterfalls and pools. Stream-flow is greatest in the spring, as the winter snow melts, and during the monsoon season. The banks of the creek are lined with willow, cottonwood and Arizona sycamore trees. The Molino Canyon Vista is located along Catalina Highway in the transition zone between Sonoran Desert cactus forest and oak-studded grassland, one mile south of the Molino Basin Campground, and provides foot access to Molino Creek.

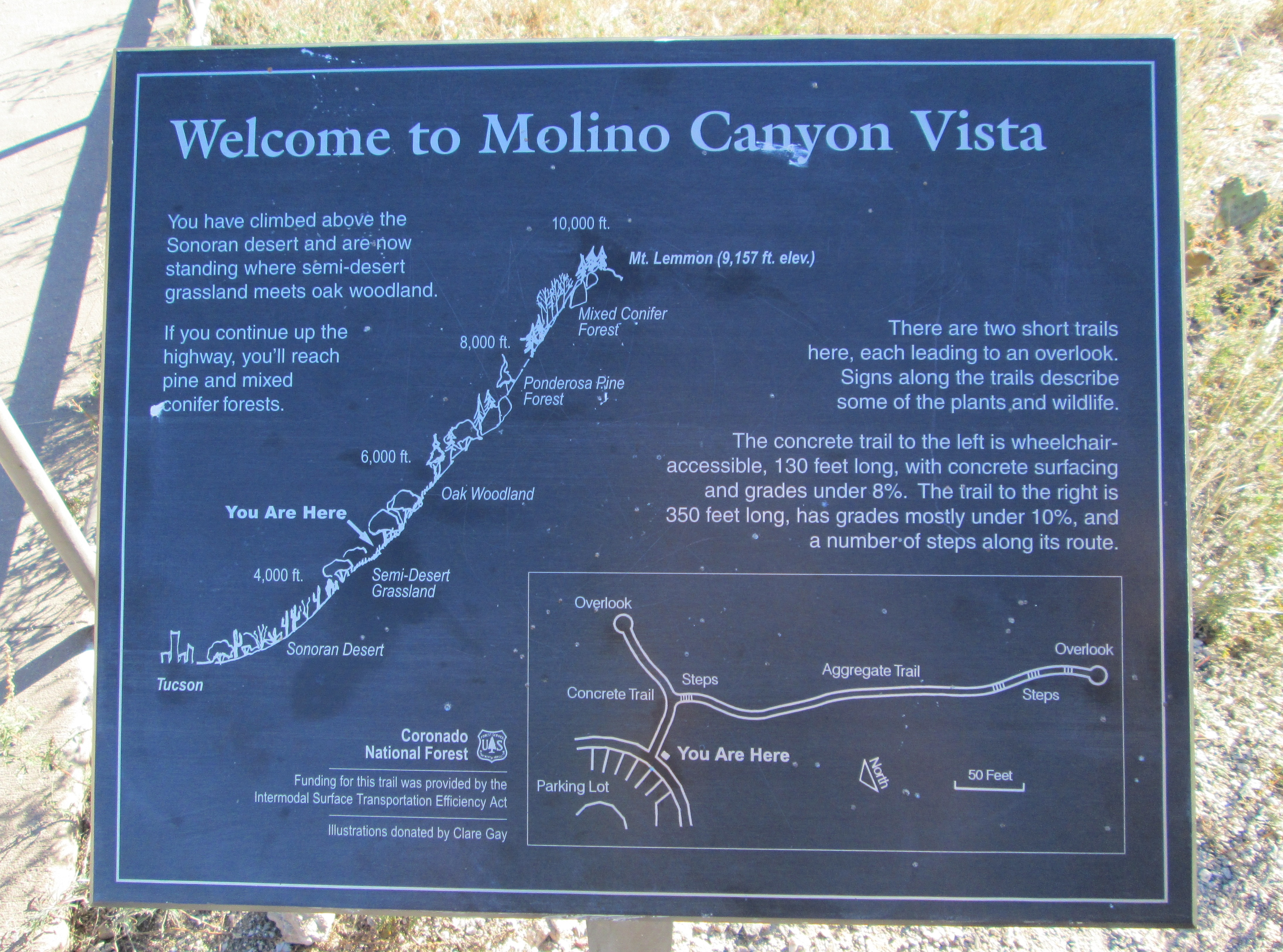
A sign at the Molino Canyon Vista

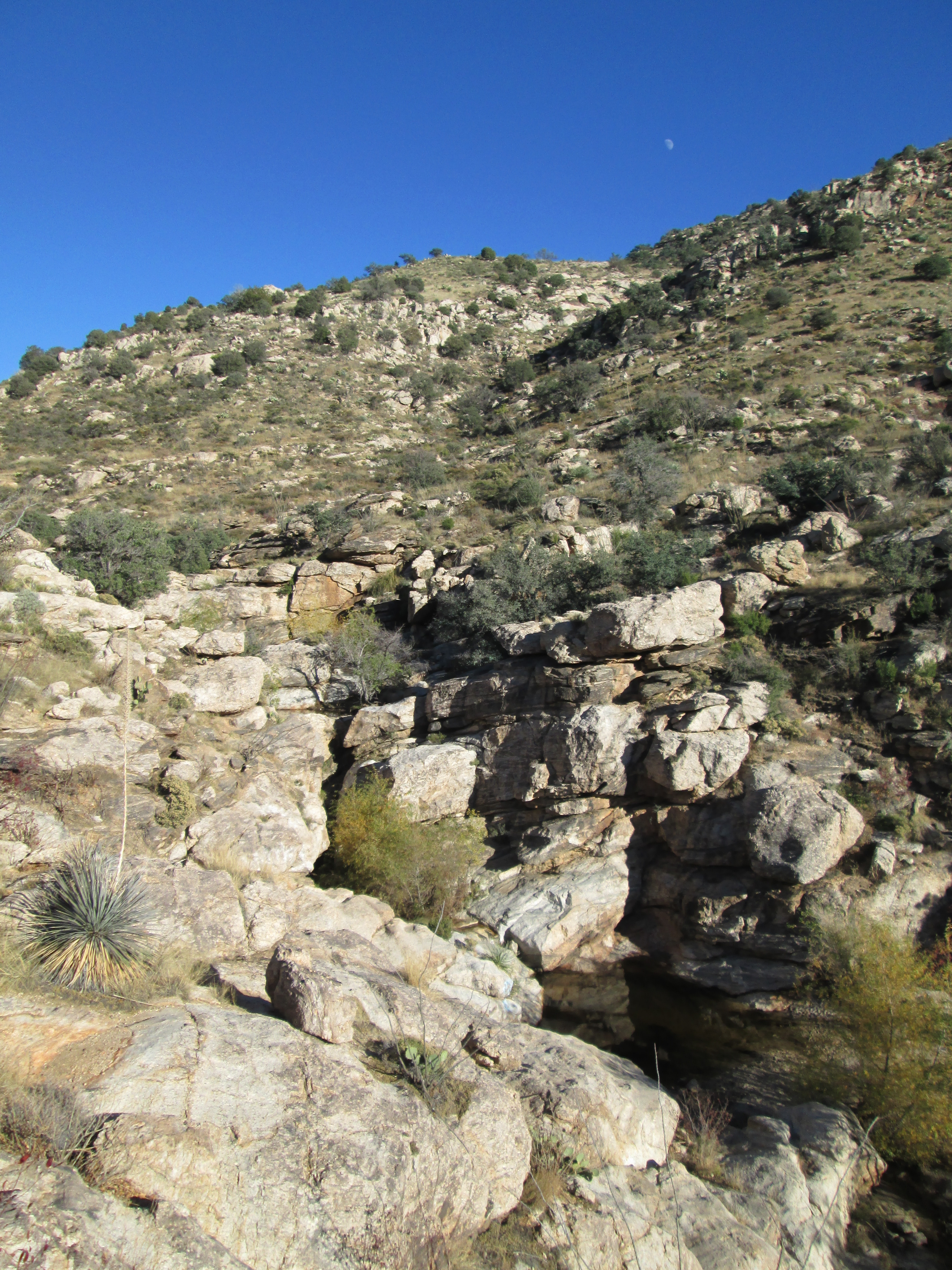
View of Molino Canyon from the Molino Canyon Vista

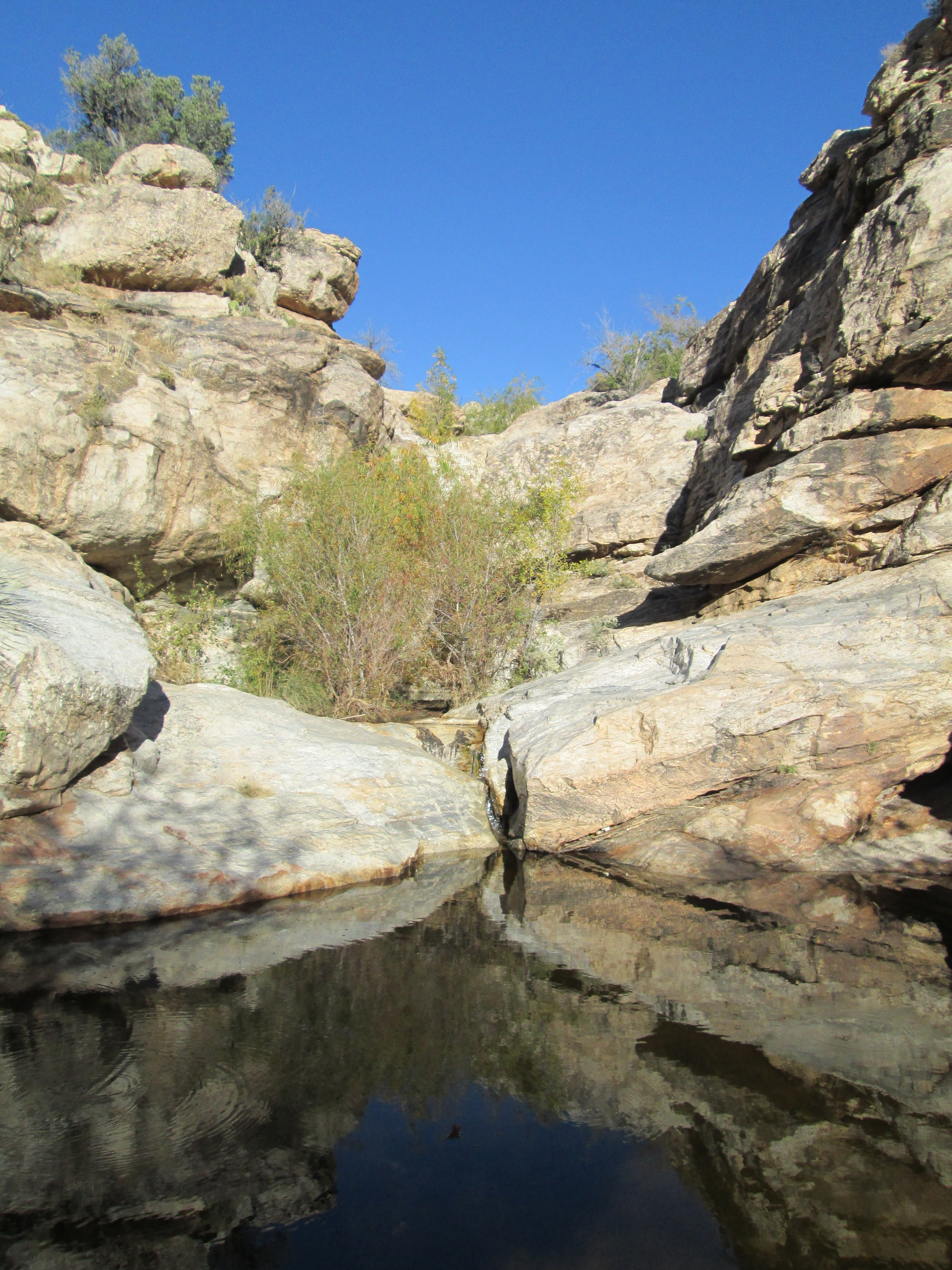
A water pool and a small waterfall along Molino Creek

== See also ==
- Sabino Canyon
- List of rivers of Arizona
