= Carnero Creek =

Stream in Apache County, Arizona

Coordinates: 34.2750°N 109.3629°W

Carnero Creek is a stream in the U.S. state of Arizona.

Carnero is a name derived from Spanish meaning "sheep".

== See also ==
- List of rivers of Arizona
