= Arivaca Creek =

Waterway in Pima County, Arizona

Coordinates: 31.6348°N 111.4248°W

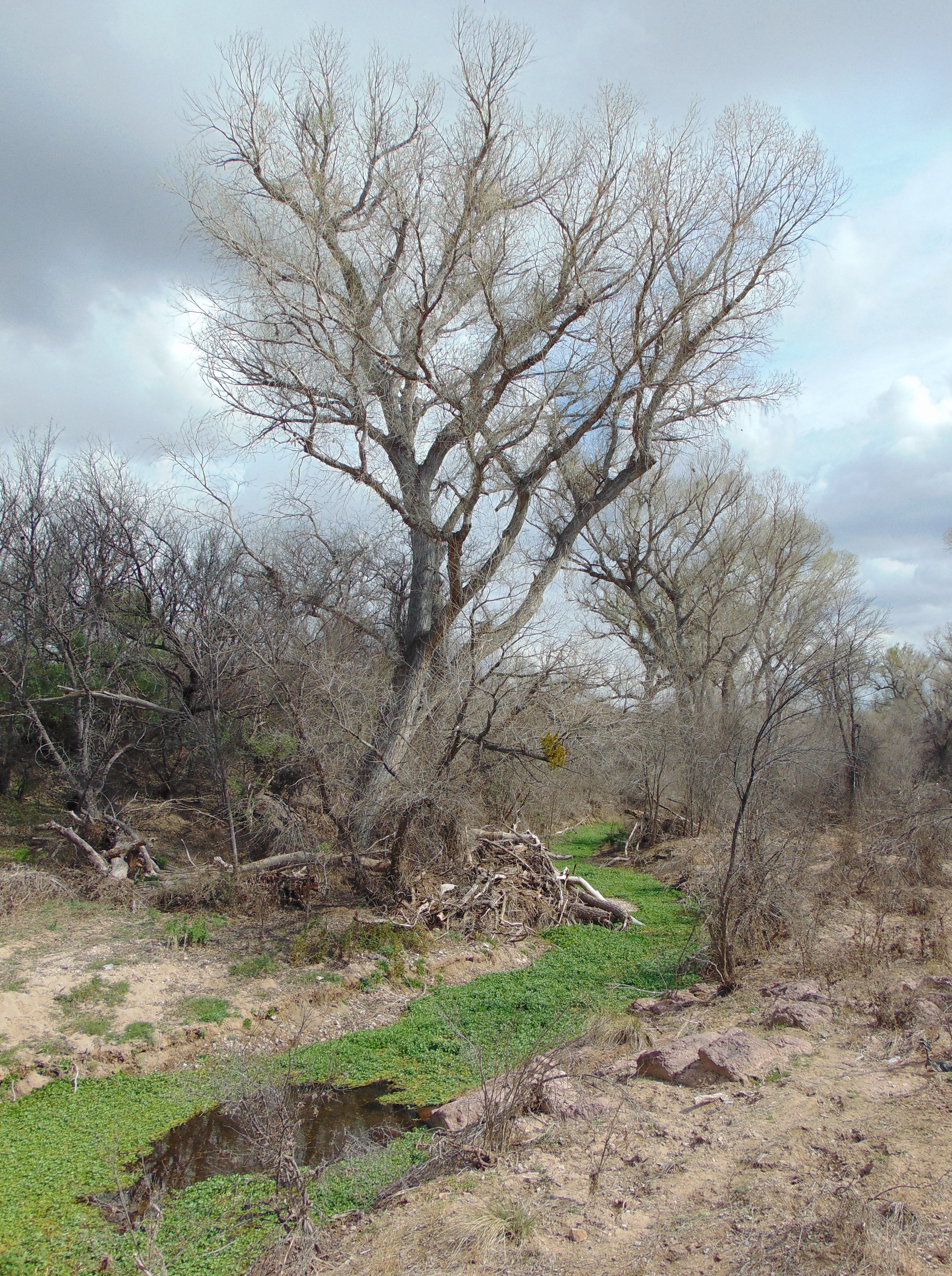
- Arivaca Creek, overgrown with water weeds.

Location
- Country: United States
- Location: Pima County, Arizona

Physical characteristics
- Source
  - location: Arivaca Valley
- Mouth
  - location: Brawley Wash
- Length: 5.5 mi (8.9 km)

Basin features
- River system: Colorado River

Arivaca Creek is a small valley stream in southern Pima County, Arizona, that is approximately 5.5 miles (8.9 km) long from its origin in Arivaca Valley to its confluence with the Brawley Wash stream system. As a seasonal stream, Arivaca Creek is perennial for only about two miles most years and experiences its greatest stream-flow during winter and the summer Monsoon season.

Most of Arivaca Creek and the riparian corridor it supports is protected as part of the Buenos Aires National Wildlife Refuge (Buenos Aires NWR). A rare swamp-like desert wetland area called Arivaca Cienega is located in the upper reaches of the creek and makes up the easternmost part of the Buenos Aires NWR. Both areas are open to the public for hiking, bird watching and other outdoor recreational activities. The small community of Arivaca, Arizona, is located along the banks of the creek, in between the Arivaca Cienega just east of town and the Arivaca Creek trailhead to the west.

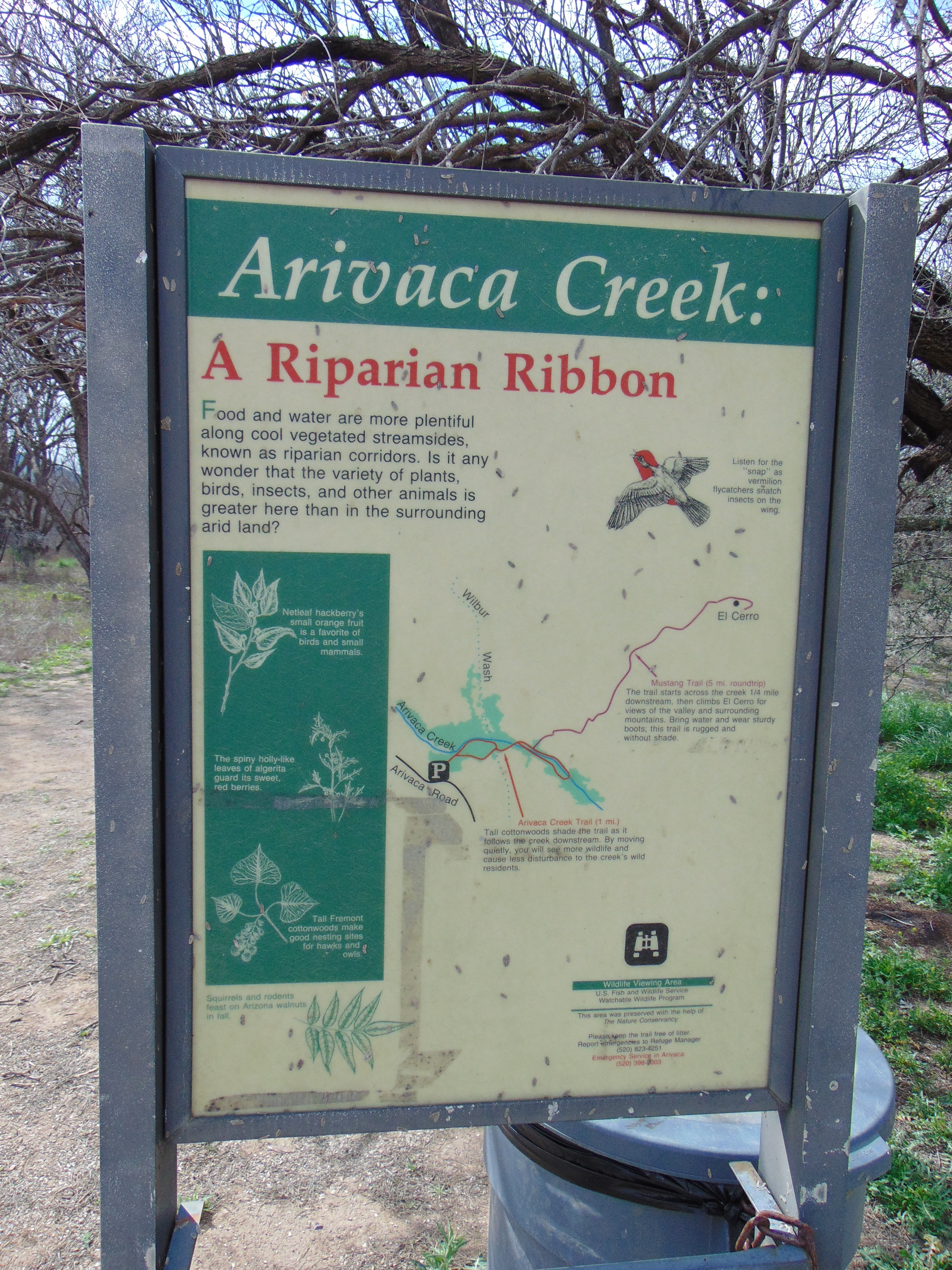
Sign at the Arivaca Creek traihead.

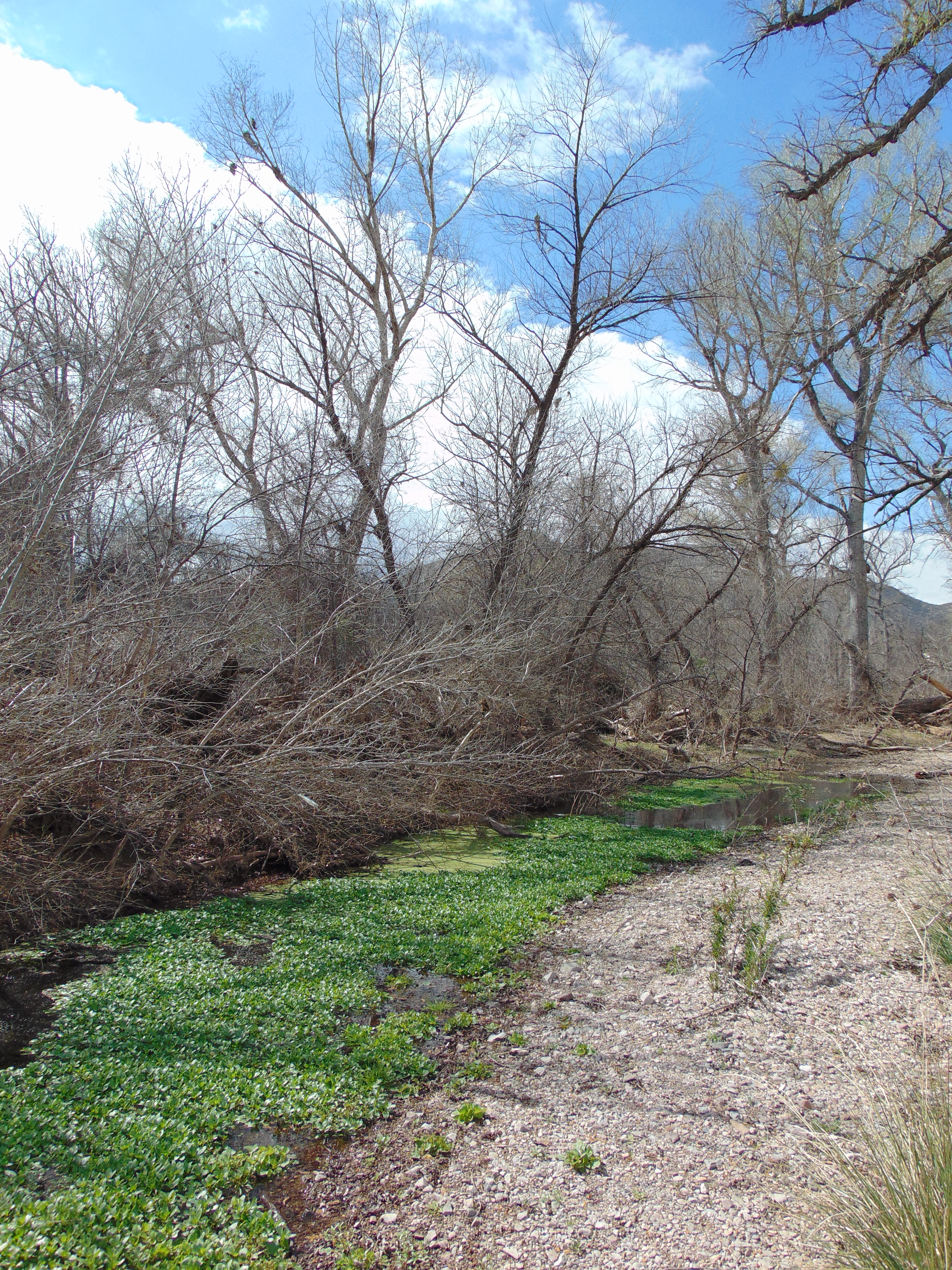
Arivaca Creek, near the ruins of the historic Wilbur Ranch House.

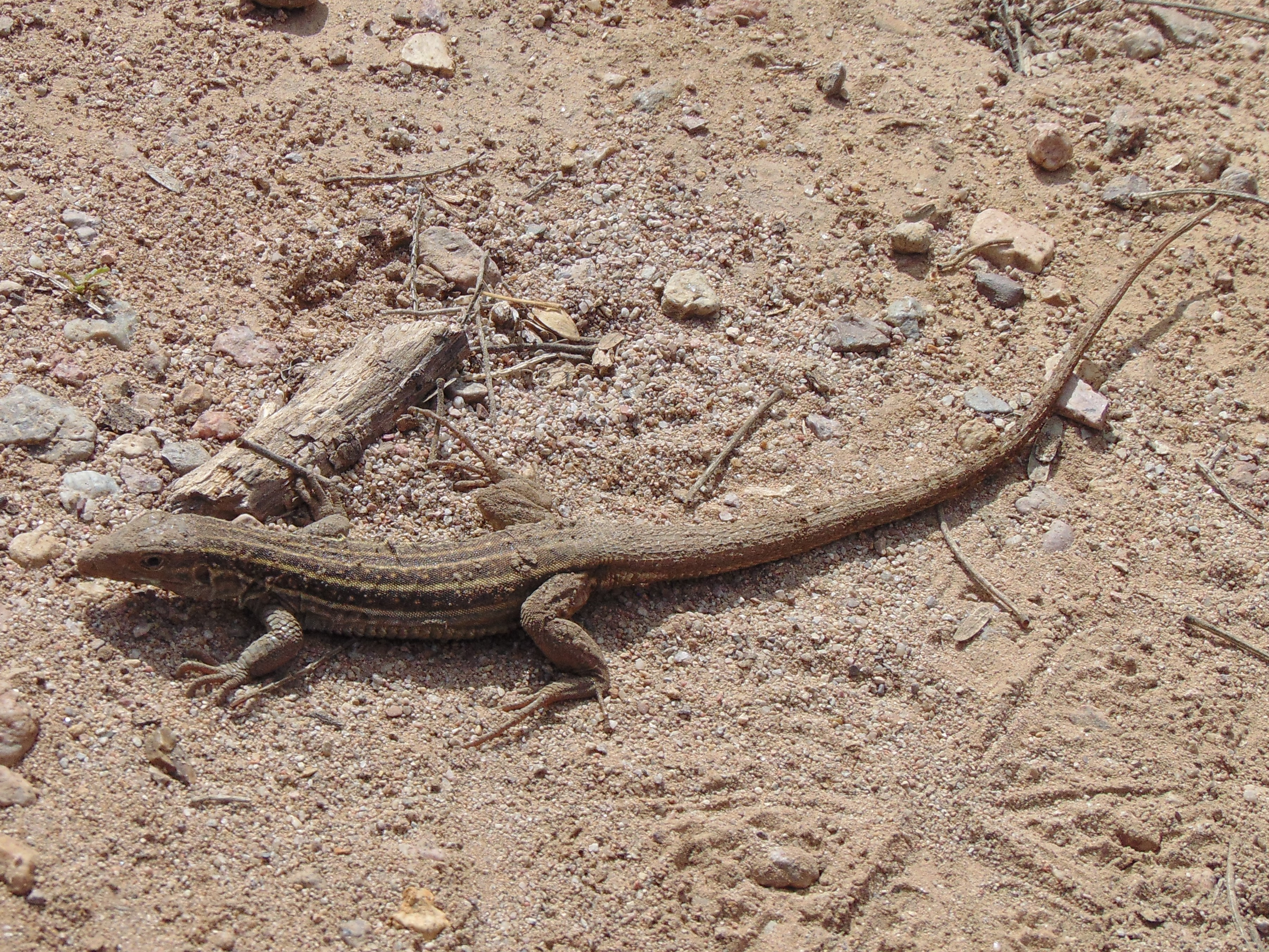
Lizard along the trail.

== See also ==
- List of Arizona rivers
