= Cañada del Oro =

Primary watershed channel in the Oro Valley, Arizona, US

Coordinates: 32°19′33″N 111°03′46″W

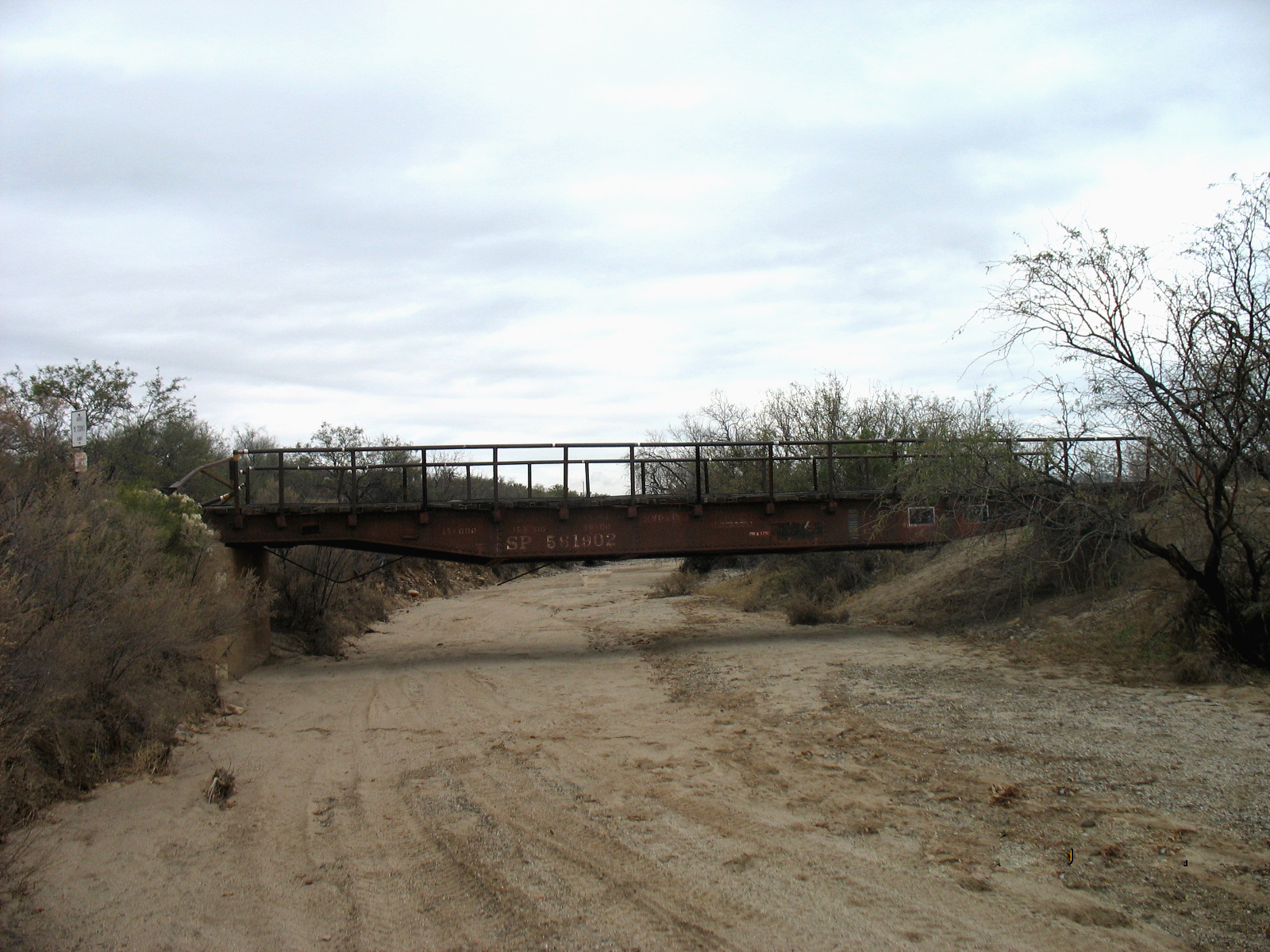

Location
- Country: United States (Arizona)

Physical characteristics
- Source
  - location: Mount Lemmon (north face)
  - elevation: 2,768 m (9,081 ft)
- Mouth
  - location: Santa Cruz River
- Length: 77.25 km (48.00 mi)

The Cañada del Oro (Spanish, 'Canyon of Gold'), is a primary watershed channel in Oro Valley, Arizona, U.S.

The Cañada del Oro originates in the remote Cañon del Oro in the Santa Catalina Mountains north of Tucson, fed by rainfall and melted snow from the northern face of Mount Lemmon and flows northward toward the town of Oracle. The Cañada del Oro is a perennial creek in Cañon del Oro at higher altitudes. The Cañada del Oro curves from flowing northward to southward through the town of Oro Valley north of Tucson, where it is usually a dry riverbed. In Oro Valley, the Cañada del Oro collects watershed from the western face of the Santa Catalina Mountains. The Cañada del Oro ultimately feeds into the Santa Cruz River just northwest of Tucson, which is the principal watershed channel in the Tucson valley.

Historically, the Cañada del Oro was the focus of significant interest in gold mining, beginning with Spanish explorers in the 17th century. As early as 1880, the Cañada del Oro was labeled "Gold Cañon Creek" on American maps. Following the Mexican–American War, American gold-rushers continued the search for the valuable mineral through the 1930s. Prospectors discovered minimal amounts of gold in the Cañada del Oro through placer mining operations, and reportedly mined gold in the Lost Mine with the Iron Door. The lost mine is the subject of a novel of the same name written by Harold Bell Wright in 1923.

== See also ==
- List of rivers of Arizona
