= Bright Angel Creek =

River in Grand Canyon National Park, United States

Coordinates: 36°6′6.12″N 112°5′44.80″W

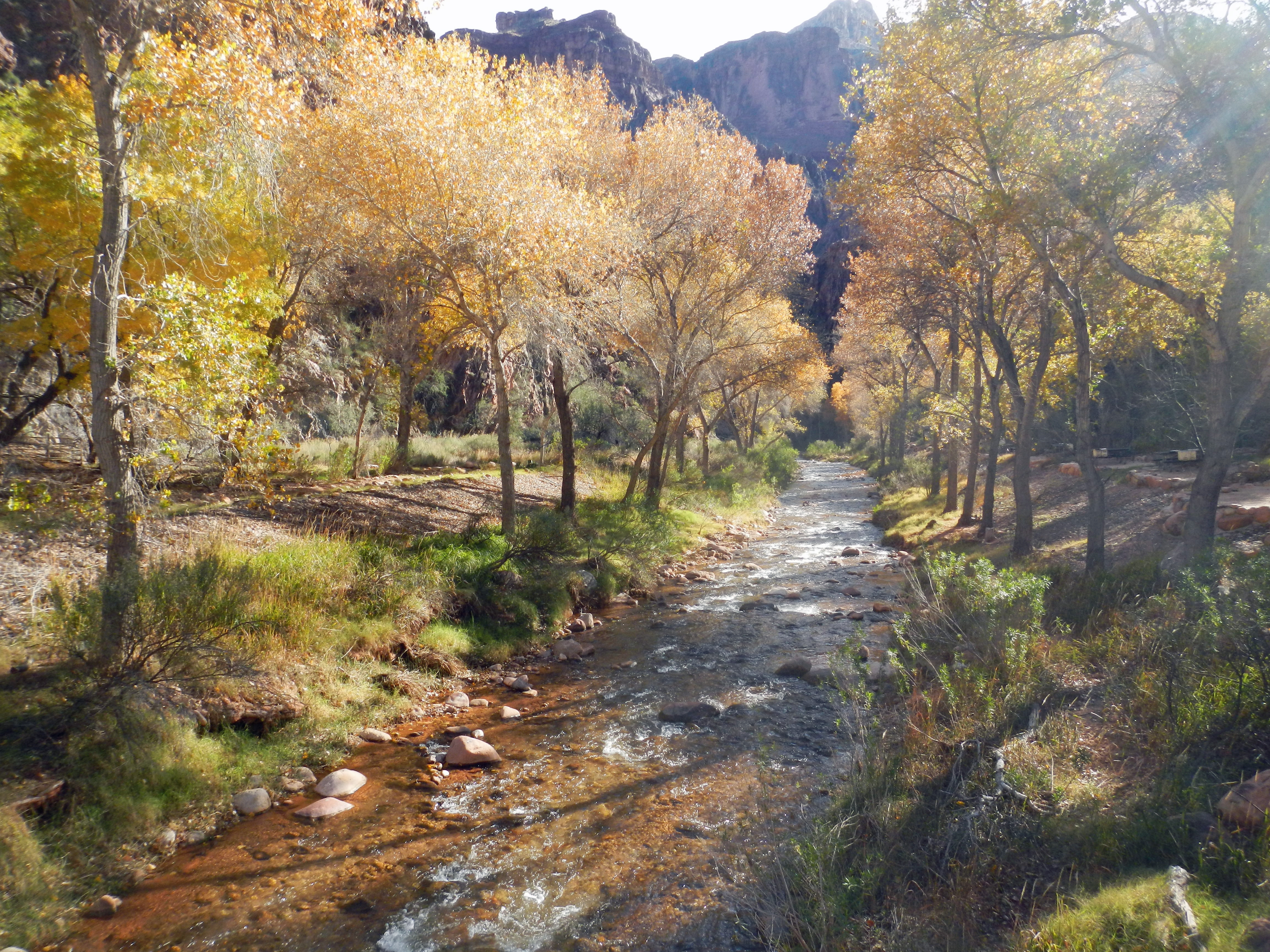
- Bright Angel Creek

Location
- Country: United States

Physical characteristics
- Length: 30.6466 km (19.0429 mi)

Bright Angel Creek is a creek located at the bottom of the Grand Canyon National Park flowing into the Colorado River at the end of the North Kaibab Trail on the north side of the river. The creek originates from Roaring Springs that emerge from a cliff along the North Kaibab Trail, and drains to the Colorado. The North Kaibab Trail follows the creek, including through "the Box," a narrow, high-walled part of the trail that becomes very hot in daylight during the summer months (April to October).

== Fish species ==
- Rainbow trout
- Brown trout
- Brook trout

== See also ==
- List of Arizona rivers
- List of tributaries of the Colorado River
