= White Mountain Grasslands Wildlife Area =

Protected area in Apache County, Arizona, US

- IUCN category IV (habitat/species management area)
- Location within Arizona
- Location: Apache County, Arizona, United States
- Coordinates: 34.076°N 109.477°W
- Area: 2,850 acres (1,150 ha)
- Established: 1999
- Governing body: Arizona Game and Fish Department
- Website: Official

The White Mountain Grasslands Wildlife Area is a wildlife area in Apache County, Arizona. Located in the White Mountains, the wildlife area was established in 1999 and is approximately seven miles west of Springerville and the nearby town of Eagar.

== See also ==
- Protected areas of the United States
