= Cibecue Creek (Arizona) =

River in Navajo County, Arizona, U.S.

Coordinates: 33°50′17″N 110°33′23″W

Cibecue Creek is a river situated in Navajo County, Arizona.

Cibecue Creek lies entirely within the Fort Apache Indian Reservation. The Cibecue Creek Valley region is home to the Cibecue Apache. The settlement of Cibecue lies on the creek, and the Battle of Cibecue Creek took place in the area.

The creek's watershed encompasses 750 square kilometres (190,000 acres) and flows from forested hills around the Apache–Sitgreaves National Forests to Salt River. In the 1960s the creek was subject to a controversial watershed management program by the Bureau of Indian Affairs involving the aggressive removal of vegetation, for example by using poison and bulldozers.
