= Deer Creek (Arizona) =

Tributary of the Colorado River in Grand Canyon National Park, Arizona

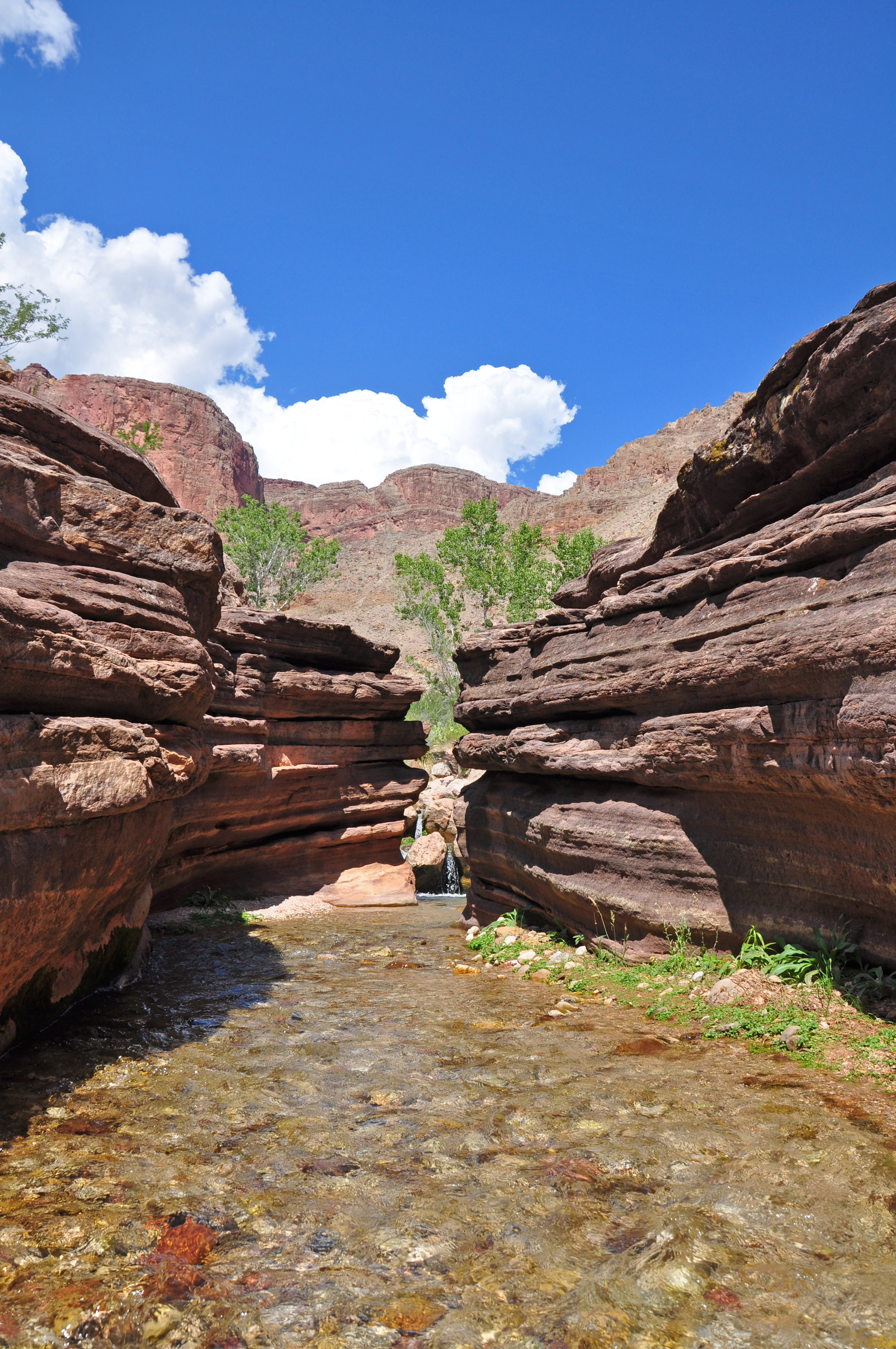
- Tapeats Sandstone in lower Deer Creek

- Location of mouth

Location
- Country: United States
- State: Arizona

Physical characteristics
- Mouth
  - coordinates: 36.3980°N 112.5055°W

Deer Creek is a stream that flows through the western part of the Grand Canyon, in the U.S. state of Arizona, as a right-bank tributary of the Colorado River. A series of natural springs provide for a perennial flow in Deer Creek. During periods of intense rainfall, Deer Creek can experience severe flash flooding. In the final half mile above the Colorado River, Deer Creek flows through a narrow slot canyon before plunging over a 150-foot (46 m) waterfall named Deer Creek Falls.

Deer Creek and its waterfall are within the boundaries of Grand Canyon National Park and are a popular stopping point for river trips through the canyon. Backpackers can also access the falls by hiking from the North Rim. The Surprise Valley trail connects the Deer Creek drainage with the adjacent Thunder River/Tapeats Creek drainage.

== See also ==
- List of tributaries of the Colorado River
- List of Colorado River rapids and features
