= Punta Carnero =

Punta Carnero may refer to:

- Punta Carnero, Spain
- Punta Carnero, Ecuador
