= List of rivers of Arizona =

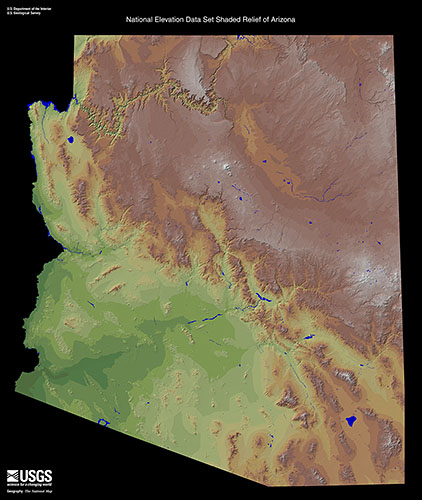
Shaded relief map, Arizona.

List of rivers in Arizona (U.S. state), sorted by name.

== By drainage basin ==
This list is arranged by drainage basin, with respective tributaries indented under each larger stream's name.

=== Colorado River ===
- Colorado River—(downstream-to-upstream)
  - Gila River—(downstream-to-upstream)
    - San Cristobal Wash
    - Tenmile Wash
    - Centennial Wash (Maricopa County)
    - Hassayampa River
    - Agua Fria River
      - Ironwood Wash
      - New River
        - Rock Springs Wash
        - Skunk Creek
          - Scatter Wash
    - Salt River
      - Indian Bend Wash
      - Verde River
        - East Verde River
        - Fossil Creek
        - West Clear Creek
        - Beaver Creek
        - Oak Creek
        - Granite Creek
        - Williamson Valley Wash
      - Pinto Creek
      - Tonto Creek
      - Cherry Creek
      - Canyon Creek
      - Cibecue Creek
      - Carrizo Creek
      - White River
      - Black River
    - Santa Cruz River
      - Santa Rosa Wash
      - Cañada del Oro
      - Madera Creek
      - Brawley Wash
        - Altar Wash
        - Alambre Wash
        - Arivaca Creek
      - Rillito River
        - Tanque Verde Creek
          - Sabino Creek
          - Agua Caliente Wash
            - Molino Creek
        - Pantano Wash
          - Rincon Creek
          - Ciénega Creek
            - Agua Verde Creek
            - Davidson Canyon
            - Mescal Arroyo
      - Sonoita Creek
        - Harshaw Creek
    - San Pedro River
      - Aravaipa Creek
      - Babocomari River
    - San Carlos River
    - San Simon River
    - Eagle Creek
    - San Francisco River
      - Blue River
  - Bill Williams River
    - Big Sandy River
    - Santa Maria River
  - Virgin River
  - Kanab Creek
  - Deer Creek
  - Tapeats Creek
    - Thunder River
  - Bright Angel Creek
  - Little Colorado River
    - Puerco River
      - Black Creek (Arizona)
    - Silver Creek
    - Zuni River
  - Paria River
- Bonita Creek

=== Yaqui River ===
- San Bernardino River; also known as Black Draw: enters Mexico as the Rio San Bernardino, where it feeds into the Bavispe River, and ultimately the Yaqui River.
  - Guadalupe Canyon Creek, tributary to the San Bernardino River joins it at just below Dieciocho de Augusto, Sonora.
  - Whitewater Draw: originally considered the upper reach of the Rio de Agua Prieta, it enters Mexico as the head of Rio de Agua Prieta, which runs southward then southeast to join the Rio de San Bernardino, at La Junta de los Rios, Sonora, about 24.5 miles southeast of Douglas, Arizona.

== Alphabetically ==
- Agua Fria River
- Agua Sal Creek
- Aravaipa Creek
- Babocomari River
- Bar X Wash
- Big Sandy River
- Bill Williams River
- Bis Ii Ah Wash
- Black River
- Blue River, Arizona
- Bonita Creek
- Bright Angel Creek
- Cañada del Oro
- Centennial Wash (Maricopa County)
- Cienega Creek
- Colorado River
- Deer Creek
- Eagle Creek
- Fossil Creek
- Gila River
- Hassayampa River
- Kanab Creek
- Little Colorado River
- Madera Creek
- Molino Creek
- New River
- Oak Creek
- Paria River
- Pinto Creek
- Puerco River
- Rillito River
- Rio de Flag
- Sabino Creek
- Salt River
- San Carlos River
- San Cristobal Wash
- San Francisco River
- San Pedro River
- San Simon River
- Santa Cruz River
- Santa Maria River
- Silver Creek
- Sonoita Creek
- Tapeats Creek
- Tenmile Wash
- Thunder River
- Tonto Creek
- Verde River
- Virgin River
- White River
- Zuni River

== See also ==
- List of mountain ranges of Arizona
- List of rivers of the United States
- List of valleys of Arizona
