= List of birds of the Madrean Sky Islands =

This is a list of birds that have been observed in the Madrean Sky Islands, which are enclaves of Madrean pine-oak woodlands, found at higher elevations in a complex of small mountain ranges in southern and southeastern Arizona, southwestern New Mexico, and northwestern Mexico. The Sky Islands are surrounded at lower elevations by the Sonoran and Chihuahuan deserts.

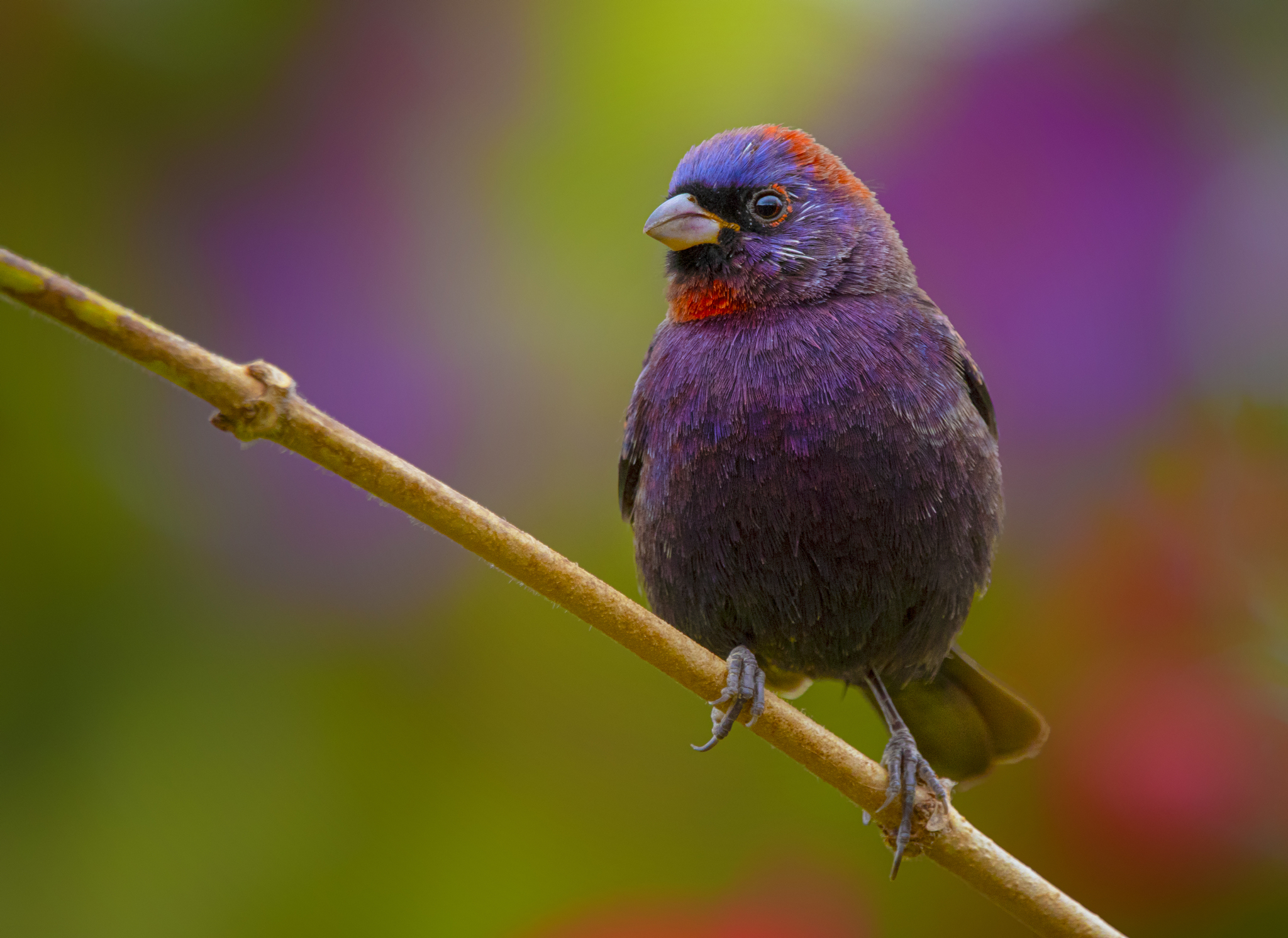
- Varied bunting (Passerina versicolor)
  Varied bunting
- Bushtit
- Mexican chickadee
- Cordilleran flycatcher
- American dusky flycatcher
- American grey flycatcher
- Hammond's flycatcher
- Nutting's flycatcher
- Sulphur-bellied flycatcher
- Black-tailed gnatcatcher
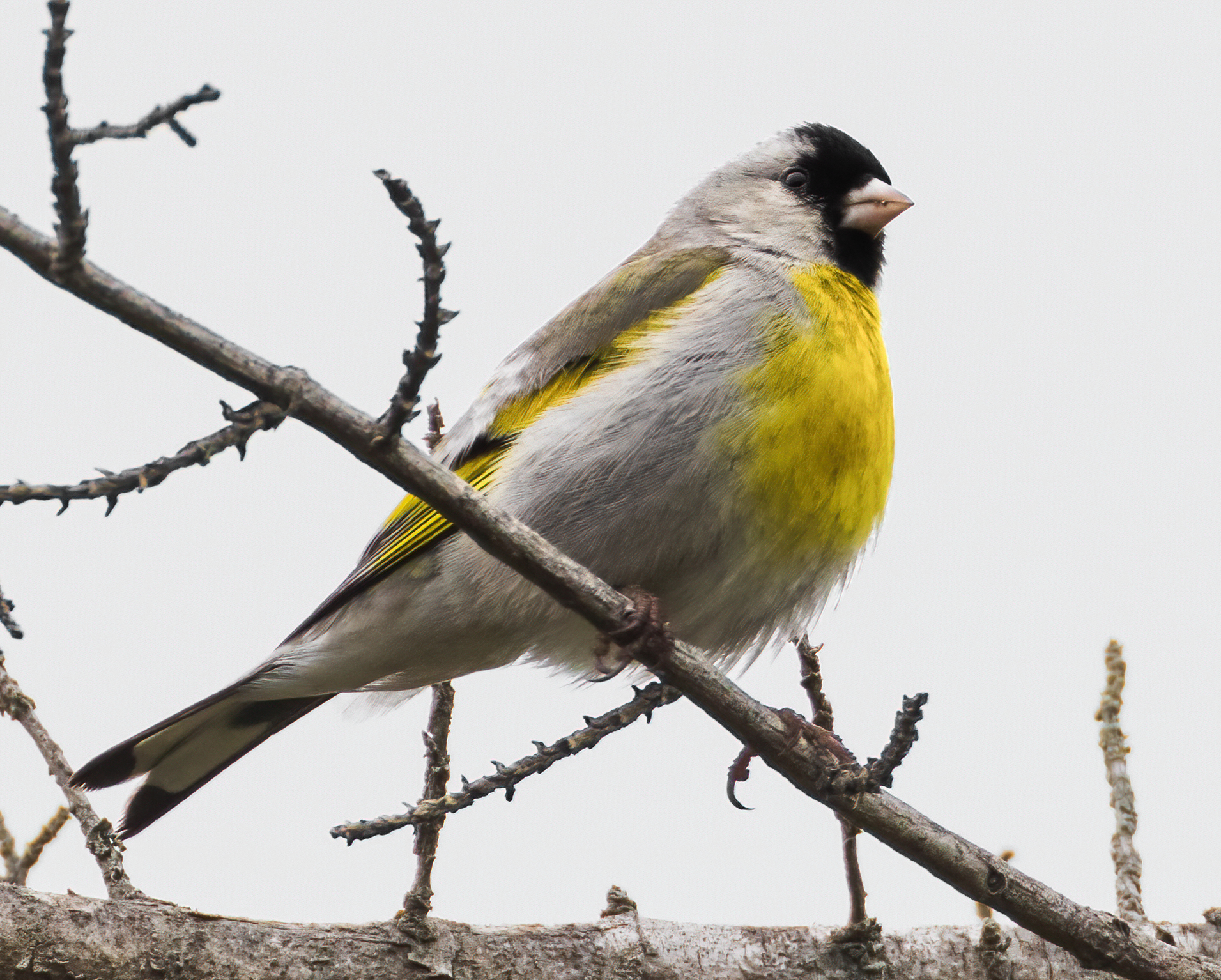
- Lawrence's goldfinch (Spinus lawrencei)
  Lawrence's goldfinch
- Black-headed grosbeak
- Anna's hummingbird
- Berylline hummingbird
- Black-chinned hummingbird
- Blue-throated hummingbird
- Broad-billed hummingbird
- Broad-tailed hummingbird
- Lucifer hummingbird
- Magnificent hummingbird
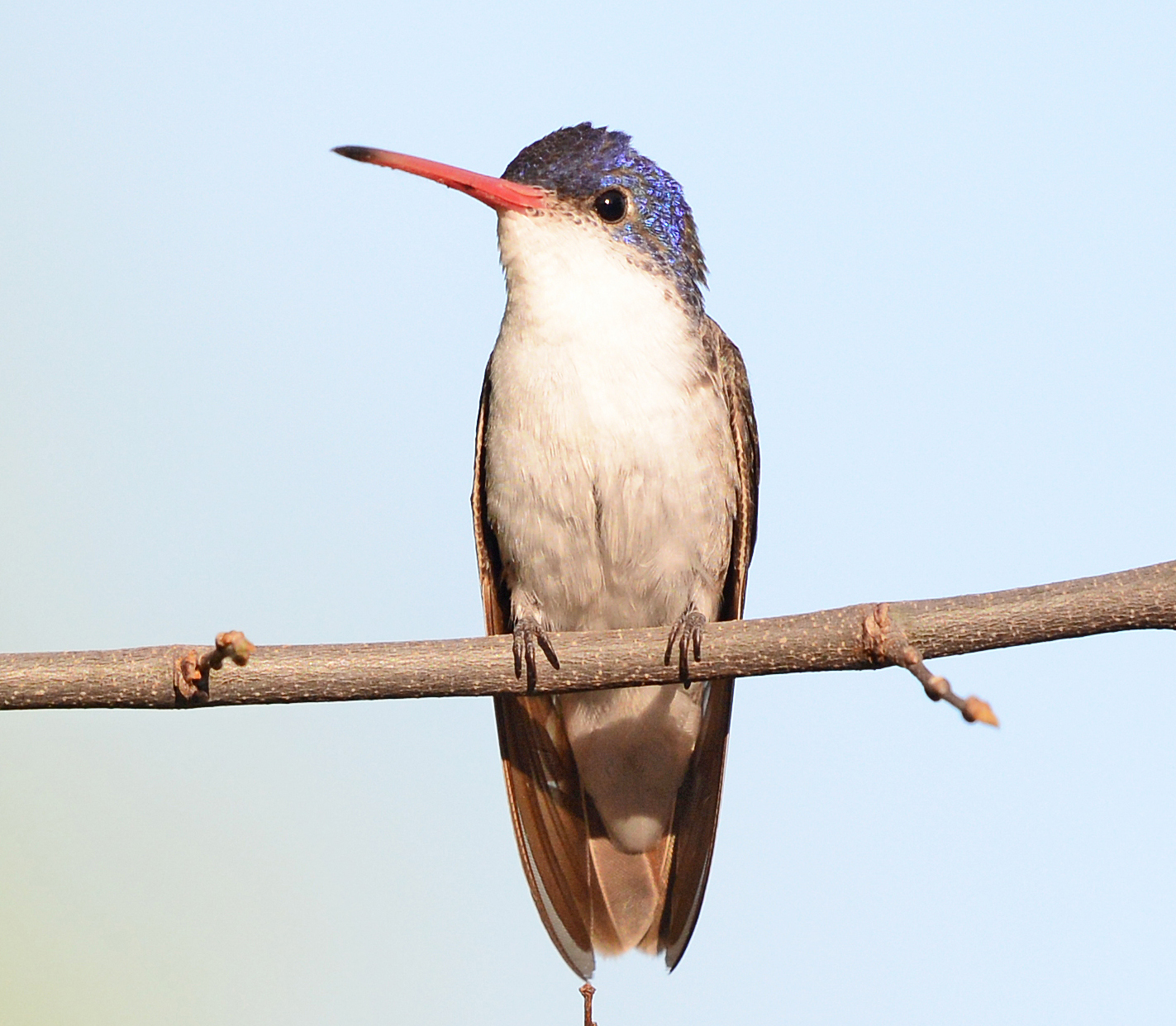
- Violet-crowned hummingbird (Ramosomyia violiceps)
  Violet-crowned hummingbird
- White-eared hummingbird
- Mexican jay
- Cassin's kingbird
- Thick-billed kingbird
- Chestnut-collared longspur
- Thick-billed longspur
- Buff-collared nightjar
- Pygmy nuthatch
- Elf owl
- Flammulated owl
- Spotted owl
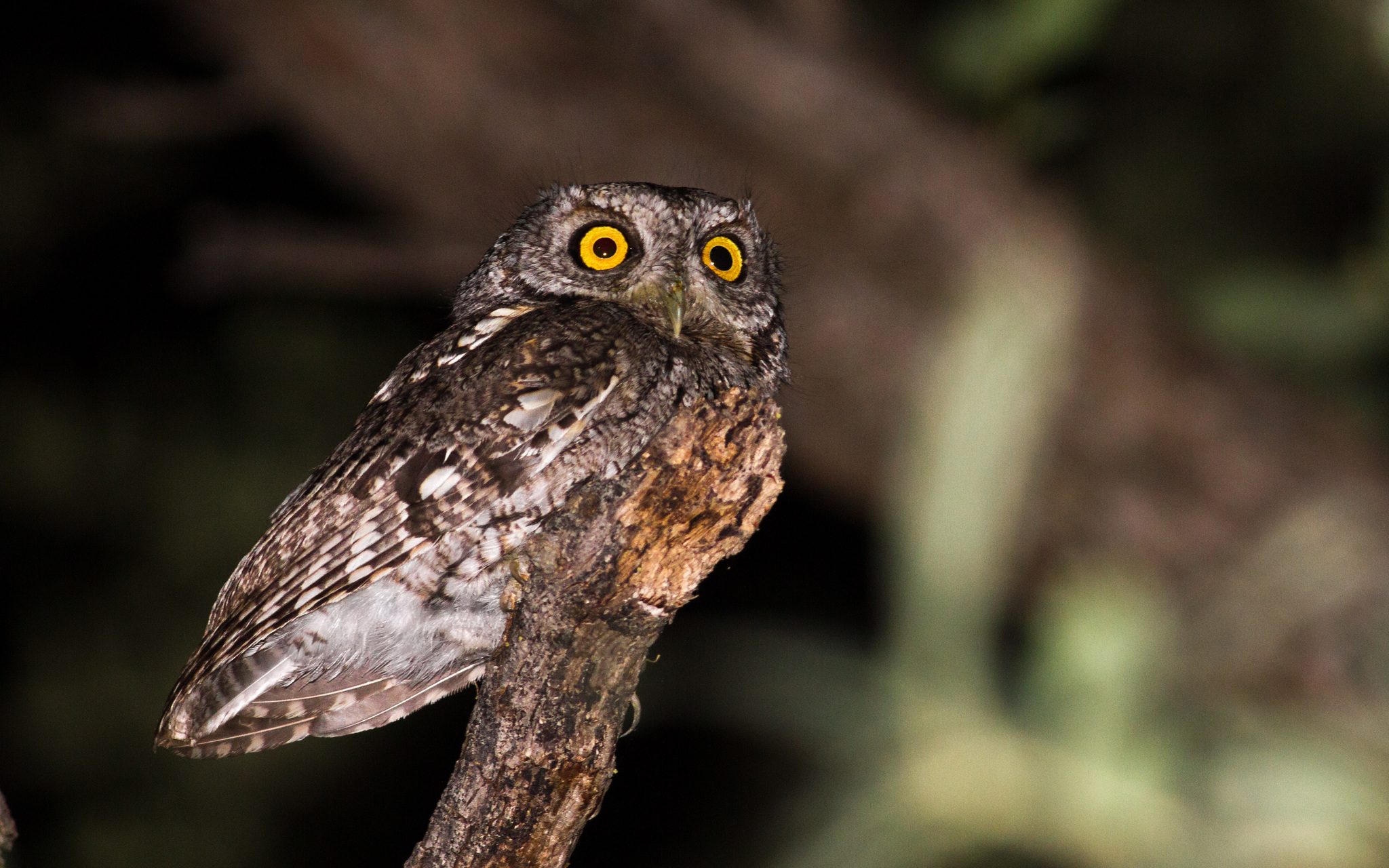
- Whiskered screech-owl (Megascops trichopsis)
  Whiskered screech-owl
- Thick-billed parrot
- Pyrrhuloxia
- Gambel's quail
- Montezuma quail
- Eared quetzal
- Chihuahuan raven
- Painted redstart
- Baird's sparrow
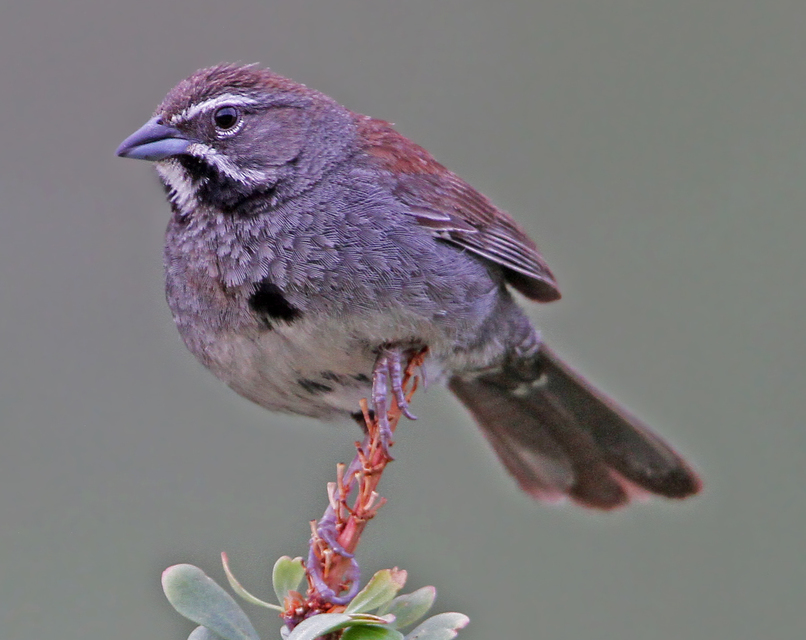
- Five-striped sparrow (Amphispiza quinquestriata)
  Five-striped sparrow
- Plain-capped starthroat
- Bendire's thrasher
- Bridled titmouse
- Juniper titmouse
- Elegant trogon
- Hutton's vireo
- Plumbeous vireo
- Grace's warbler
- Olive warbler
- Red-faced warbler
- Acorn woodpecker
- Arizona woodpecker
- Gila woodpecker
- Brown-throated wren
