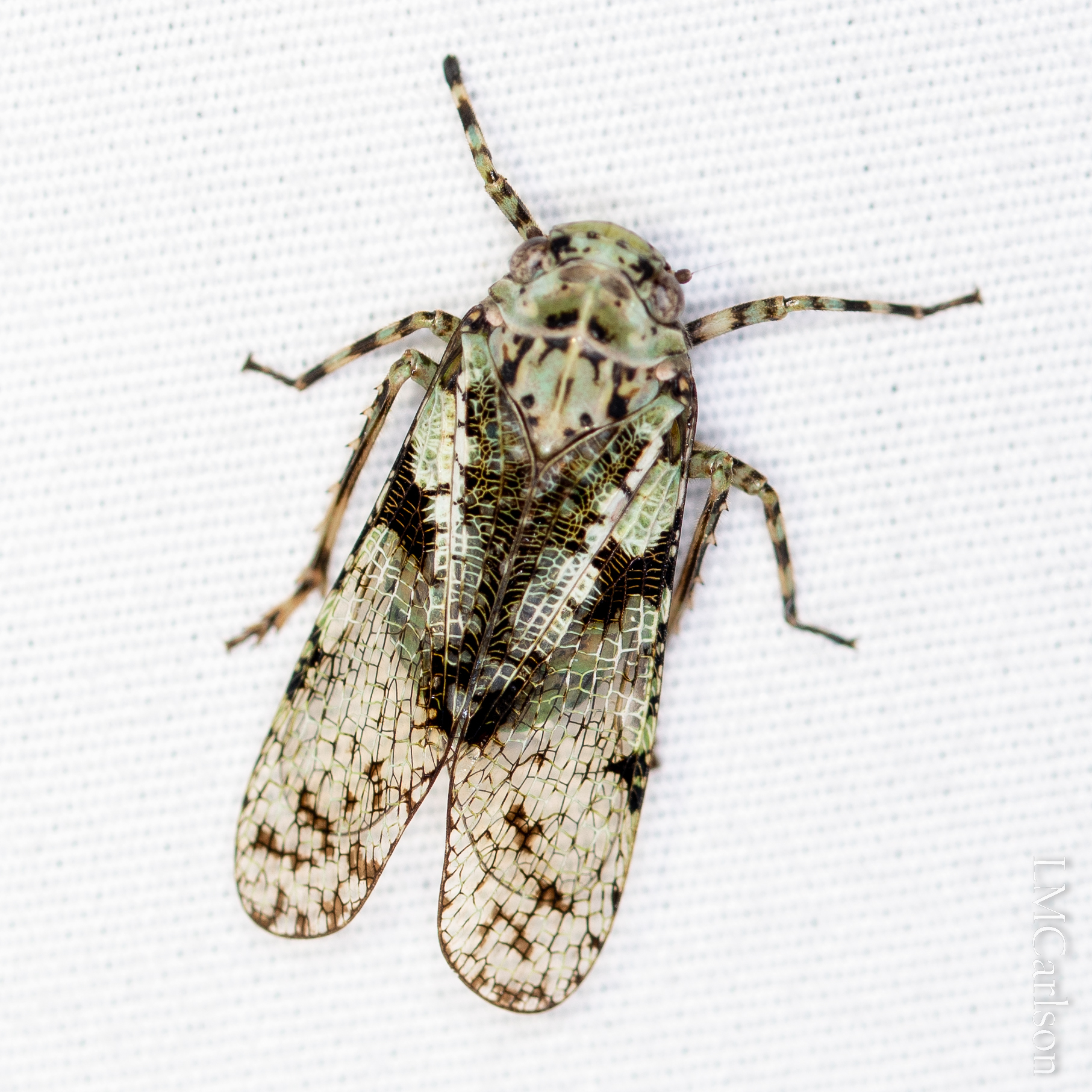
- Scaralina marmorata

Scientific classification
- Domain: Eukaryota
- Kingdom: Animalia
- Phylum: Arthropoda
- Class: Insecta
- Order: Hemiptera
- Suborder: Auchenorrhyncha
- Infraorder: Fulgoromorpha
- Family: Fulgoridae
- Subfamily: Poiocerinae
- Tribe: Poiocerini
- Genus: Scaralina; Yanega, 2024

Type species
- Calyptoproctus marmoratus Spinola, 1839

= Scaralina =

Genus of planthoppers

Scaralina is a genus of planthoppers in the family Fulgoridae occurring in North America and Central America, from Idaho to Panama.

== Biology ==
All but one of the known species of Scaralina occur at higher elevations, above 1000 meters, and appear to be associated with oaks (Quercus spp.). Adults are readily and commonly attracted to blacklights, and are especially abundant and diverse in the Madrean Sky Islands bioregion.

== Species ==
- Scaralina aethrinsula Yanega & Van Dam, 2024
- Scaralina chapina Goemans & Yanega, 2024
- Scaralina cristata Yanega & Van Dam, 2024
- Scaralina durango Yanega, 2024
- Scaralina gigantea Yanega, 2024
- Scaralina hawksi Yanega, 2024
- Scaralina marmorata (Spinola, 1839) (= Alphina glauca (Metcalf, 1923))
- Scaralina metcalfi Yanega & Van Dam, 2024
- Scaralina monzoni Goemans & Yanega, 2024
- Scaralina obfusca Yanega, 2024
- Scaralina obrienae Yanega & Van Dam, 2024
- Scaralina orientalis Yanega, 2024
- Scaralina rileyi Yanega, 2024
- Scaralina sullivani Yanega, 2024
- Scaralina veracruzensis Yanega & Van Dam, 2024
