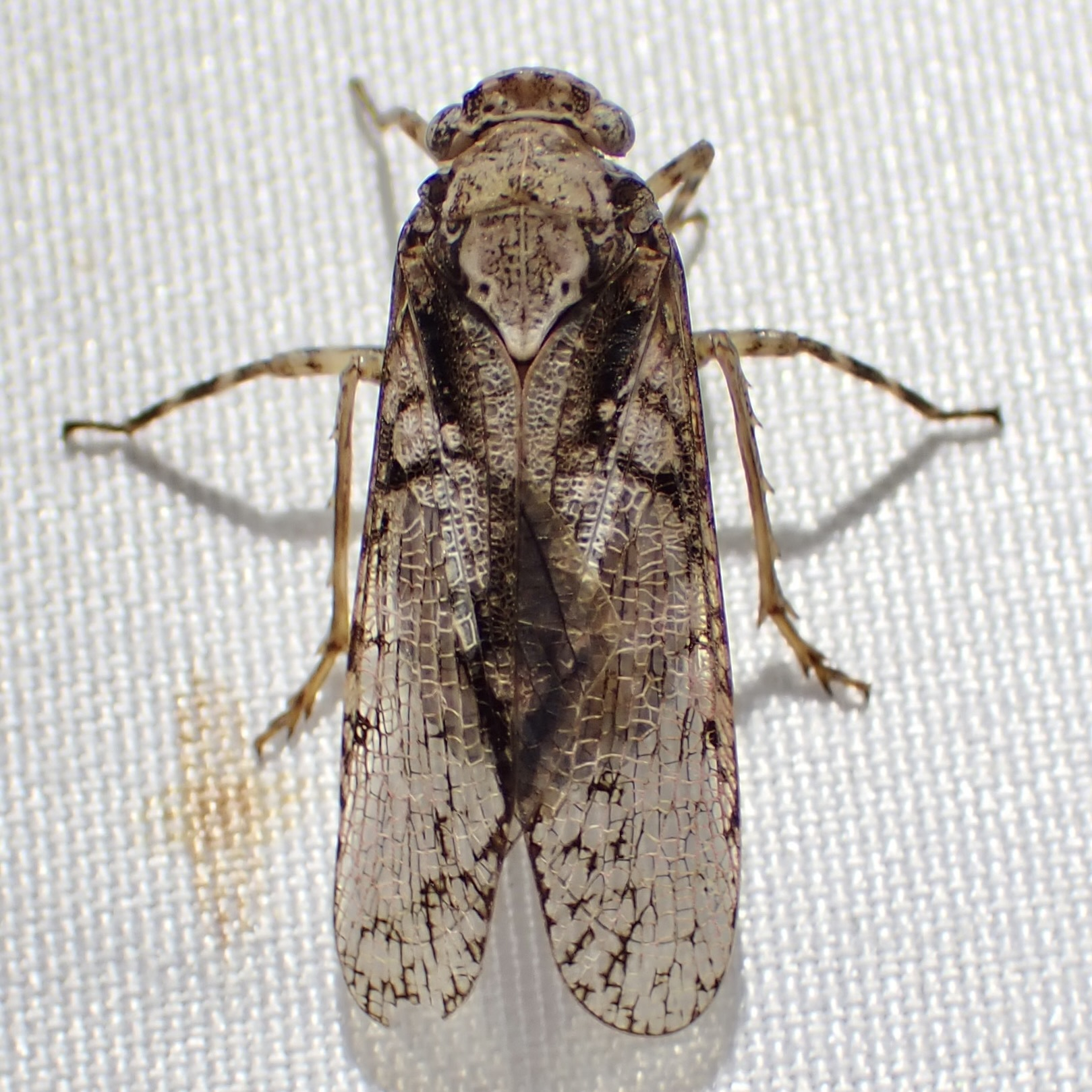

Scientific classification
- Domain: Eukaryota
- Kingdom: Animalia
- Phylum: Arthropoda
- Class: Insecta
- Order: Hemiptera
- Suborder: Auchenorrhyncha
- Infraorder: Fulgoromorpha
- Family: Fulgoridae
- Genus: Scaralina
- Species: S. aethrinsula

Binomial name
- Scaralina aethrinsula Yanega & Van Dam, 2024

= Scaralina aethrinsula =

Species of planthopper

Scaralina aethrinsula is a species of planthopper in the family Fulgoridae. It is found from Idaho in the United States south to the Sierra Madre Occidental in Mexico. It is one of four species (the others being Scaralina cristata, Scaralina marmorata, and Scaralina metcalfi) that were, for several decades, erroneously grouped together under a single name, Alphina glauca; this name is now treated as a synonym of S. marmorata.

== Biology ==
Scaralina aethrinsula typically occurs at higher elevations, above 1000 meters, and is associated with oaks (Quercus spp.). It has been reared on Quercus arizonica, but this may not be its preferred host species. Adults are readily and commonly attracted to blacklights.

== Distribution ==
Scaralina aethrinsula is most often found in the Madrean Sky Islands in Arizona, but also extending east of the Continental Divide into the Magdalena and Sacramento Mountains of New Mexico, north and west into Utah and Idaho, and south into the Sierra Madre Occidental in the state of Chihuahua. In Arizona, its range overlaps the ranges of Scaralina cristata and Scaralina metcalfi, and all three species can be found together.
