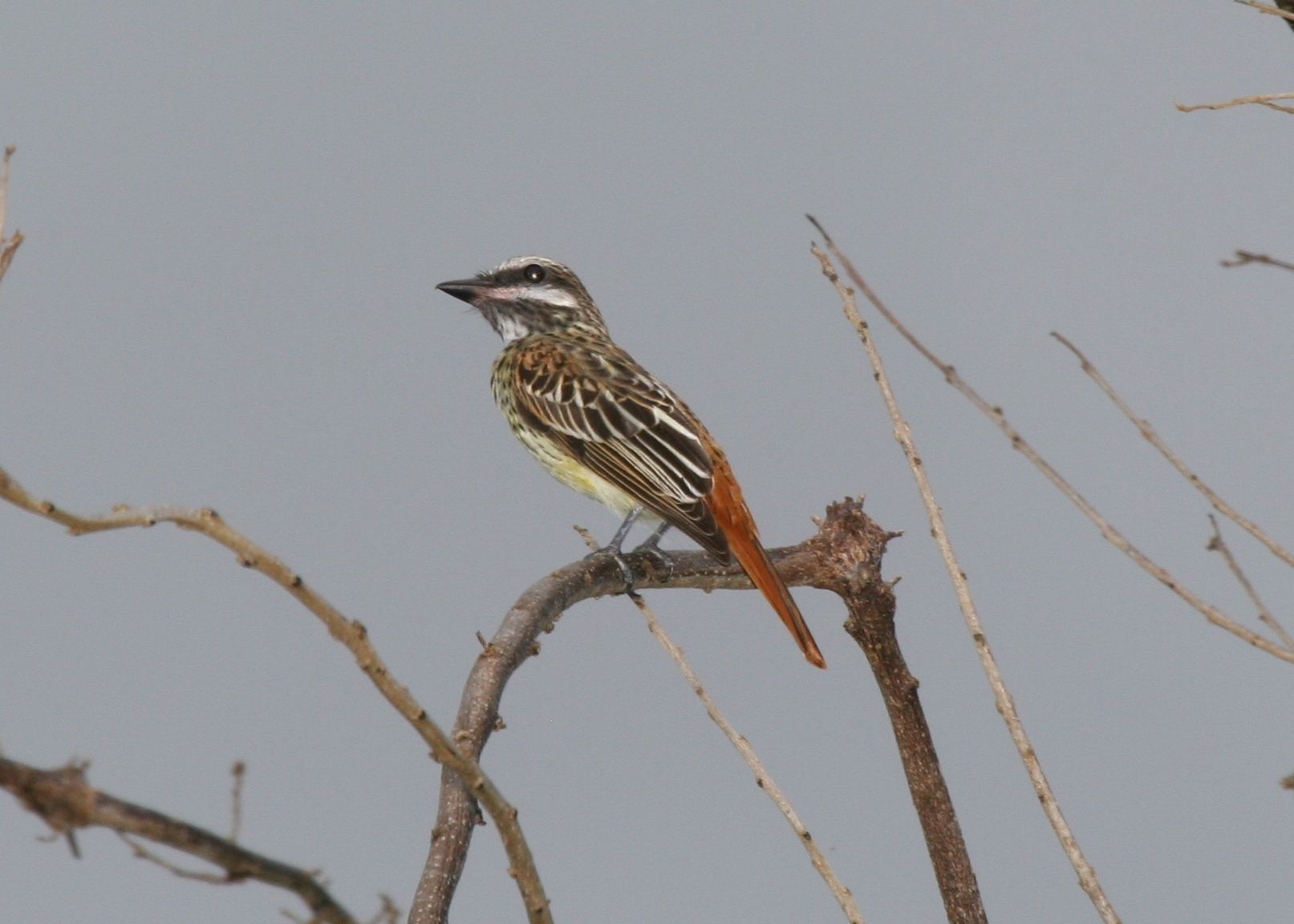

Conservation status
- Least Concern (IUCN 3.1)

Scientific classification
- Kingdom: Animalia
- Phylum: Chordata
- Class: Aves
- Order: Passeriformes
- Family: Tyrannidae
- Genus: Myiodynastes
- Species: M. luteiventris

Binomial name
- Myiodynastes luteiventris Sclater, PL, 1859
- Breeding Migration Non-Breeding

= Sulphur-bellied flycatcher =

Species of bird

The sulphur-bellied flycatcher (Myiodynastes luteiventris) is a large member of the family Tyrannidae, the tyrant flycatchers. It is regularly found from southern Arizona in the United States south to Bolivia and occurs casually or as a vagrant further north, east, and south of its usual range.

== Taxonomy and systematics ==
The sulphur-bellied flycatcher is monotypic. Because there is much clinal variation in size and plumage, several subspecies have been proposed but not accepted. The sulphur-bellied flycatcher and the streaked flycatcher (M. maculatus) are sister species.

== Description ==
The sulphur-bellied flycatcher is about 20 cm (7.9 in) long and weighs about 40 to 57 g (1.4 to 2.0 oz). The sexes have the same plumage. Adults have a pale hoary gray or grayish white forecrown and supercilium. They have a brownish gray to olive crown with blackish streaks and a large, usually hidden, canary-yellow patch in the center. They have dusky lores; the color extends to the ear coverts and forms a dark "mask". Below the mask is a wide white stripe with thin dusky streaks and below that a thin dusky stripe. Their nape and upperparts to the upper rump are light olive with a buffy tinge and dusky centers to the feathers that give a streaked appearance. Their lower rump and uppertail coverts are cinnamon-rufous with dusky streaks. Their wings are dusky with wide yellowish white to primrose yellow edges on the outer webs of the median and greater coverts and inner secondaries. The inner webs of the median coverts have wide grayish olive to buffy grayish edges, the outer greater coverts have a pale cinnamon wash, and the outer webs of the primary coverts and primaries have thin pale olive to buffy grayish edges. Their tail is mostly cinnamon-rufous with dusky shafts that show as streaks. Their chin and the sides of their throat are grayish olive with dusky streaks and the rest of their throat is white with dusky streaks. The rest of their underparts are primrose-yellow to sulphur-yellow with wide coarse black or dusky streaks on the breast and thinner streaks on the sides and flanks. They have a brown to dark brown iris, a dusky or blackish bill with a dusky white base to the mandible, and dusky, plumbeous, or black legs and feet. Juveniles have little or no yellow crown patch, a strong brownish buffy tinge to their upperparts, and cinnamon-buff edges on the wing coverts and secondaries.

== Distribution and habitat ==
The sulphur-bellied flycatcher breeds in the Madrean sky islands of southeastern Arizona and south from there through western Mexico to central Costa Rica. It also breeds from southern Nuevo León and southern Tamaulipas in northeastern Mexico south through eastern Mexico, including the Yucatán Peninsula, to join the western range in Guatemala. It is absent in central Mexico, the northern tip of the Yucatán Peninsula, and from central Chiapas into south-central Guatemala. It passes in migration from Costa Rica south through Panama and western Colombia and winters on the eastern slope of the Andes from northern Ecuador south through eastern Peru and across most of north-central Bolivia. There are multiple records in California, central Arizona, New Mexico, and Texas and a few in Louisiana, Alabama, and Florida. It has occurred as a vagrant in Nevada and Massachusetts, and in Ontario, New Brunswick, and Newfoundland in Canada. In South America it has occurred as a vagrant in Brazil, Chile, and Venezuela.

In its breeding range the sulphur-bellied flycatcher inhabits deciduous forest, gallery forest, and the edges of evergreen forest in the tropical and subtropical zones. In Arizona it typically is found in riparian canyons. In migration the species favors somewhat open woodlands and the edges of denser forest. On its wintering grounds it mostly inhabits forest along rivers but also occurs in disturbed and secondary forest and in the edges and canopy of unbroken tropical forest. In Mexico and northern Central America it ranges in elevation mostly between sea level and about 1,800 m (5,900 ft). In Costa Rica it breeds up to 2,000 m (6,600 ft) but not in the Caribbean lowlands; migrants are found up to 2,200 m (7,200 ft). In Colombia it is found below 2,500 m (8,200 ft). In Ecuador it is found only below 400 m (1,300 ft) but in Peru ranges between 350 and 1,200 m (1,100 and 3,900 ft).

== Behavior ==
=== Movement ===
The sulphur-bellied flycatcher leaves Arizona in early September and returns early in May. In northern Mexico most have left before late September. The species returns to southern Mexico in late March and reaches northern Mexico in May. It leaves northern Central America by the end of October and returns in early March. In Costa Rica it is present as a breeder between April and September. It migrates south through the country between early March and mid-May and north between early August and mid-October. It passes south through Panama and Colombia in September and October and north in March and April. It is present in Ecuador mostly between October and April and in Peru from September to April.

== Feeding ==
The sulphur-bellied flycatcher feeds on insects year-round and in the non-breeding season adds much fruit to its diet. There are few data about its foraging technique, which is assumed to be similar to that of others of its genus. Those species usually perch in trees from about their mid-height to the canopy. They take insect prey with sallies to glean it from another perch, to snatch it during a brief hover, and in mid-air by hawking. They take most fruits by gleaning while perched.

=== Breeding ===
The sulphur-bellied flycatcher breeds between April and early August. The female alone builds the nest in a tree cavity, either natural or excavated by a woodpecker. The nest is a cup made from small sticks, pine needles, and rootlets and is usually lined with softer plant material. The usual clutch is three or four eggs that are white to creamy buff with red, lilac, or purple blotches. The incubation period is about 16 days; the female alone incubates. The time to fledging is not known. Both parents provision nestlings.

=== Vocalization ===
Only male sulphur-bellied flycatchers sing. The song is variously described as a "soft, liquid, almost warbled tre-le-re-re, tre-le-re-re", a "persistently repeated, a soft chu-eer", and a "clipped, slightly liquid phrase: chee-a-leet s-lik or chew-ee ti-lit or doo-ee ti-chu". Its "screech" call has been compared to "the protest of a wagon wheel that needs oiling". Another call is described as "an excited, piercing to shrill, 'squeezy-toy'-like wee'iz-uh and weez-ih, often doubled". It also makes "cheer", "chu-eer", and "tseu or chew" calls and "a woodpecker-like puck".

== Status ==
The IUCN has assessed the sulphur-bellied flycatcher as being of Least Concern. It has an extremely large range and its estimated population of at least two million mature individuals is believed to be stable. No immediate threats have been identified. It is considered uncommon in Arizona, fairly common to common in Mexico and northern Central America, and common both as a breeder and migrant in Costa Rica. It is a fairly common migrant through Colombia and in Ecuador and Peru.
