= Scaralina cristata =

Scientific classification
- Kingdom: Animalia
- Phylum: Arthropoda
- Class: Insecta
- Order: Hemiptera
- Suborder: Auchenorrhyncha
- Infraorder: Fulgoromorpha
- Family: Fulgoridae
- Genus: Scaralina
- Species: S. cristata

Binomial name
- Scaralina cristata Yanega & Van Dam, 2024

Species of planthopper

Scaralina cristata is a species of planthopper in the family Fulgoridae. It is found from Arizona in the United States south to the Sierra Madre Occidental in Mexico. It is one of four species (the others being Scaralina aethrinsula, Scaralina marmorata, and Scaralina metcalfi) that were, for several decades, erroneously grouped together under a single name, Alphina glauca; this name is now treated as a synonym of S. marmorata.

== Biology ==
Scaralina cristata typically occurs at higher elevations, above 1000 meters, and is associated with oaks (Quercus spp.). It has been reared on Quercus arizonica, but this may not be its preferred host species. Adults are readily and commonly attracted to blacklights.

== Distribution ==
Scaralina cristata is most often found in the Madrean Sky Islands in Arizona down into Sonora, but also with populations of putative conspecifics extending east of the Continental Divide into New Mexico, and south as far as the state of Durango. In Arizona, its range overlaps the ranges of Scaralina aethrinsula and Scaralina metcalfi, and all three species can be found together.
