= Scaralina metcalfi =

Scientific classification
- Domain: Eukaryota
- Kingdom: Animalia
- Phylum: Arthropoda
- Class: Insecta
- Order: Hemiptera
- Suborder: Auchenorrhyncha
- Infraorder: Fulgoromorpha
- Family: Fulgoridae
- Genus: Scaralina
- Species: S. metcalfi

Binomial name
- Scaralina metcalfi Yanega & Van Dam, 2024

Species of planthopper

Scaralina metcalfi is a species of planthopper in the family Fulgoridae. It is found from Arizona in the United States south to the Sierra Madre Occidental in Mexico. It is one of four species (the others being Scaralina aethrinsula, Scaralina cristata, and Scaralina marmorata) that were, for several decades, erroneously grouped together under a single name, Alphina glauca; this name is now treated as a synonym of S. marmorata.

== Biology ==
Scaralina metcalfi typically occurs at higher elevations, above 1000 meters, and is associated with oaks (Quercus spp.). Of the three co-occurring species in the area where it is found, it is much rarer than the other two species, and may feed on a rarer host oak species.

== Distribution ==
Scaralina metcalfi is found in a subset of the Madrean Sky Islands in Arizona down into Chihuahua. In Arizona, its range is overlapped by the ranges of Scaralina aethrinsula and Scaralina cristata, and all three species can be found together.
