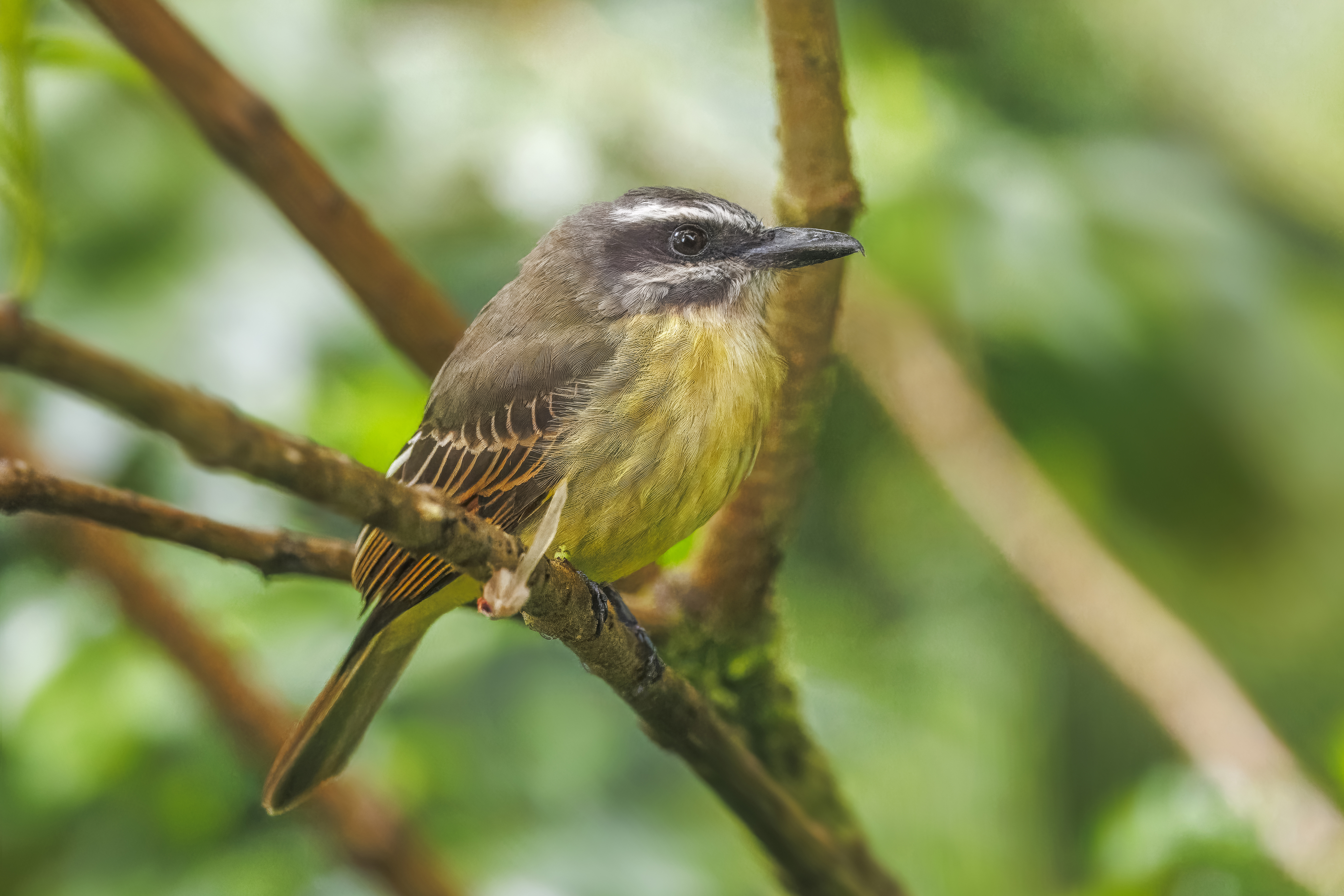
- Myiodynastes hemichrysus minor, Ecuador

Conservation status
- Least Concern (IUCN 3.1)

Scientific classification
- Kingdom: Animalia
- Phylum: Chordata
- Class: Aves
- Order: Passeriformes
- Family: Tyrannidae
- Genus: Myiodynastes
- Species: M. hemichrysus

Binomial name
- Myiodynastes hemichrysus (Cabanis, 1861)

= Golden-bellied flycatcher =

Species of bird

The golden-bellied flycatcher (Myiodynastes hemichrysus) is a passerine bird in the family Tyrannidae, the tyrant flycatchers. It is found in Colombia, Costa Rica, Ecuador, Panama, Peru, and Venezuela.

== Taxonomy and systematics ==
The golden-bellied flycatcher has a complicated taxonomic history. It was originally described as Hypermitres hemichrysus. By the early 1900s it had been reassigned to genus Myiodynastes, which had been erected in 1847. A 1927 publication treated it as a subspecies of the golden-crowned flycatcher (M. chrysocephalus).

By at least 1979 it was again being treated as a full species. At that time it was considered monotypic. A 2016 publication detailed the vocal differences and similarities between the golden-bellied flycatcher and the three subspecies of the golden-crowned flycatcher. Based on that study, by 2020 BirdLife International's Handbook of the Birds of the World moved two subspecies from the golden-crowned to the golden-bellied. The Clements taxonomy followed suit in 2022 and the IOC and both subcommittees of the American Ornithological Society in 2023. The golden-bellied and golden-crowned flycatchers are sister species.

The golden-bellied flycatcher has these three subspecies:

- M. h. hemichrysus (Cabanis, 1861)
- M. h. minor Taczanowski & Berlepsch, 1885
- M. h. cinerascens Todd, 1912

== Description ==
The golden-bellied flycatcher is 20 to 22 cm (7.9 to 8.7 in) long and weighs about 39 to 42.5 g (1.4 to 1.5 oz). The sexes have the same plumage. Adults of the nominate subspecies M. h. hemichrysus have a thinly black-streaked, dusky grayish olive or dark sooty gray, crown and nape with a large, usually hidden, yellow patch in the center of the crown. They have a wide white supercilium, a wide blackish stripe through the lores and ear coverts, and a grayish olive or dusky cheek with a whitish stripe through it. Their upperparts are mostly olive green with a greenish rump and uppertail coverts; the last have cinnamon edges at their tips. Their wings are dusky grayish brown with thin cinnamon or cinnamon-buff edges on the greater coverts. The inner primaries and outer secondaries have thin cinnamon edges and the inner secondaries have wider whitish yellow edges. Their tail is mostly dark grayish brown with wide pale cinnamon or cinnamon-buff edges on the feathers' inner webs. Their chin is whitish, their throat canary-yellow, and rest of their underparts deep lemon-yellow with faint indistinct olive streaks on the breast. Subspecies M. h. minor is slightly darker than the nominate with more brownish olive upperparts. M. h. cinerascens is essentially the same as the nominate. Juveniles do not have a yellow patch on the crown. They have more brownish olive-green upperparts and paler, slightly buffy underparts than adults. All subspecies have a brown iris, a stout black or brownish black bill with a brownish base to the mandible, and dusky gray legs and feet.

== Distribution and habitat ==
The golden-bellied flycatcher has a disjunct distribution. The nominate subspecies is the most northerly of the three. It is found from the Cordillera de Guanacaste in northern Costa Rica south to Veraguas Province in western Panama. Subspecies M. h. minor is found from Darién Province in easternmost Panama south through all three ranges of the Colombian Andes and the Andes of Ecuador into Peru north of the Marañon River. M. h. cinerascens is found in the Sierra Nevada de Santa Marta in northern Colombia, the Serranía del Perijá on the Colombia-Venezuela border, and in the mountains of western and northern Venezuela from Zulia and Táchira east to Sucre and Monagas states.

The golden-bellied flycatcher inhabits the canopy and edges of humid to wet montane forest, especially cloudforest, in the upper tropical and subtropical zones. It is often found along roads and watercourses and at the edges of natural and human-made clearings. It also occurs in plantations and other human-modified habitats. In Costa Rica and Panama it is found between about 800 and 1,800 m (2,600 and 5,900 ft) on the Caribbean slope and up to 2,300 m (7,500 ft) on the Pacific slope. It occurs between 1,000 and 2,900 m (3,300 and 9,500 ft) in Colombia, mostly between 1,000 and 2,200 m (3,300 and 7,200 ft) in Ecuador, and between 600 and 2,300 m (2,000 and 7,500 ft) in Venezuela.

== Behavior ==
=== Movement ===
The golden-bellied flycatcher is believed to be a year-round resident across its range. However, some authors have suggested that in Panama and the Venezuelan Andes it makes some elevational movements with the seasons.

=== Feeding ===
The golden-bellied flycatcher feeds on insects and fruit; it appears to be partial to adult butterflies and moths. It usually forages in pairs or small family groups and rarely joins mixed-species feeding flocks. It perches from the mid-level to near the crown of a tree and takes prey and fruits mostly with short upward sallies to glean it from vegetation. It takes some insect prey in mid-air by hawking.

=== Breeding ===
The golden-bellied flycatcher's breeding season has not been fully defined but appears to span at least January to July overall. The only well-described nests were shallow open cups made from rootlets and other thin fibers and sometimes included moss. The female alone builds it. Nests have been found between 2 and 30 m (7 and 100 ft) above the ground in epiphytes high up on a tree branch, in nooks among roots, and in niches and on ledges on earthen banks and cliff faces. The clutch is two to four eggs. Their color is variable among the subspecies but they generally have a whitish or cream ground with cinnamon, chestnut, or gray speckles and blotches. The incubation period and time to fledging are not known. There is one observation on record of both parents provisioning young; no other details of parental care are known.

=== Vocalization ===
The few studies to date have revealed little difference among the vocalizations of the three golden-bellied flycatcher subspecies. The species' dawn song is a "repeated simple phrase kwee!-tee-tu, also transcribed as tree-le-loo, squeeE-yu-drr or PSEE-chirr-rr". Its day song is a "repeated loud strident skeeew! or skeeeuu!". It also makes a "chatter call", a "loud squeaky series of identical double notes skee-kit..skee-kit..skee-kit". The golden-bellied flycatcher typically sings from a perch in or near the forest canopy.

== Status ==
The IUCN has assessed the golden-bellied flycatcher as being of Least Concern. It has a very large range; its population size is not known and is believed to be decreasing. No immediate threats have been identified. It is considered fairly common in Costa Rica, common in Colombia and Ecuador, uncommon in Peru, and fairly common in Venezuela.
