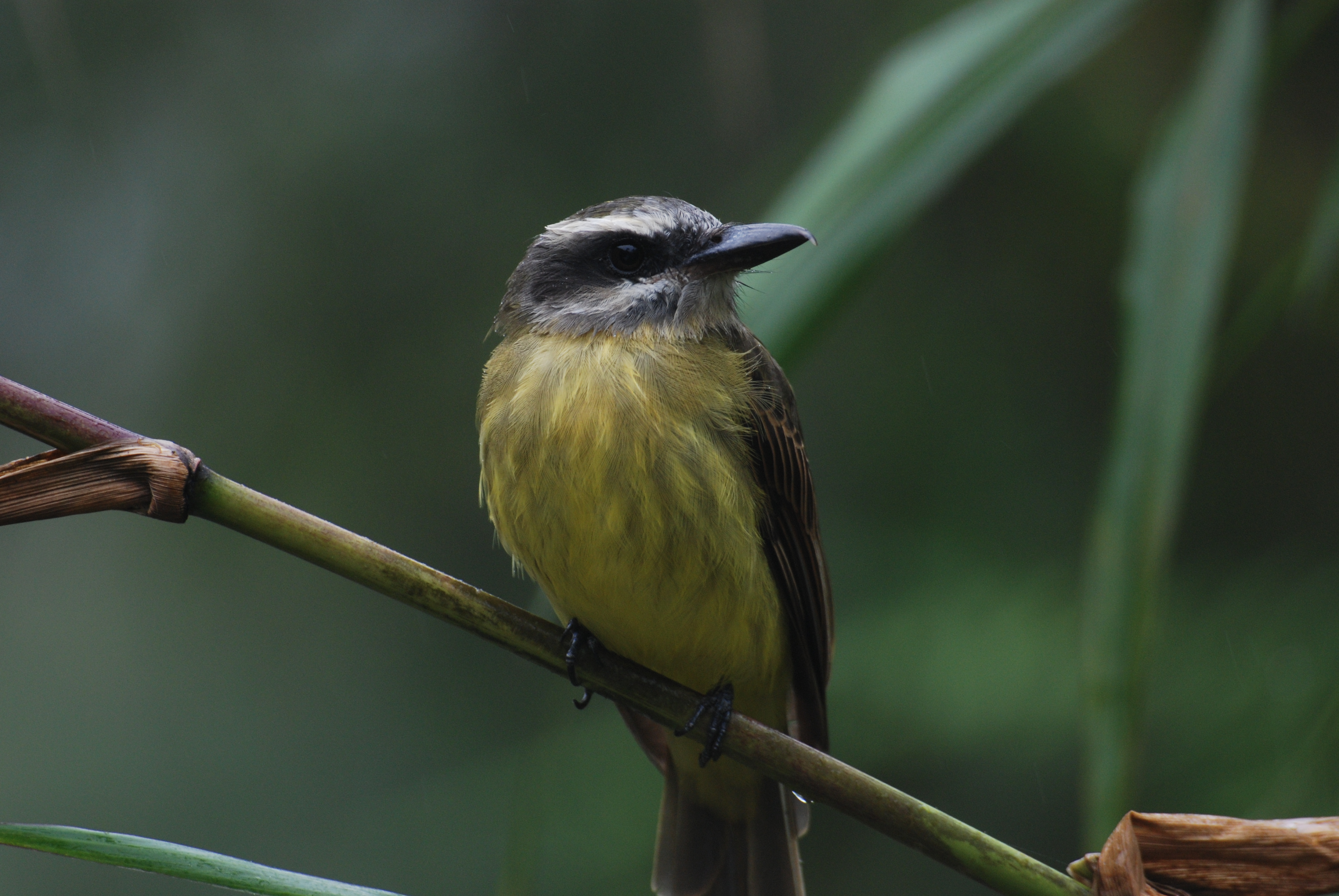
- Golden-crowned flycatcher Myiodynastes chrysocephalus

Scientific classification
- Kingdom: Animalia
- Phylum: Chordata
- Class: Aves
- Order: Passeriformes
- Family: Tyrannidae
- Genus: Myiodynastes; Bonaparte, 1857

Type species
- Myiodynastes audax Bonaparte, 1857

Species
- Myiodynastes bairdii Myiodynastes chrysocephalus Myiodynastes hemichrysus Myiodynastes luteiventris Myiodynastes maculatus

= Myiodynastes =

Genus of birds

Myiodynastes is a genus of birds in the family Tyrannidae. Created by Charles Lucien Bonaparte in 1857, the genus contains five species which are collectively referred to as "sulphur-bellied flycatchers"; that name is also given to one of the individual species in the genus. The genus name Myiodynastes is a compound word composed from two Greek words: muia, meaning "fly" and dunastẽs, meaning "ruler".

== List of species ==
The genus contains five species:

- Golden-bellied flycatcher (Myiodynastes hemichrysus)
- Golden-crowned flycatcher (Myiodynastes chrysocephalus)
- Baird's flycatcher (Myiodynastes bairdii)
- Sulphur-bellied flycatcher (Myiodynastes luteiventris)
- Streaked flycatcher (Myiodynastes maculatus)
