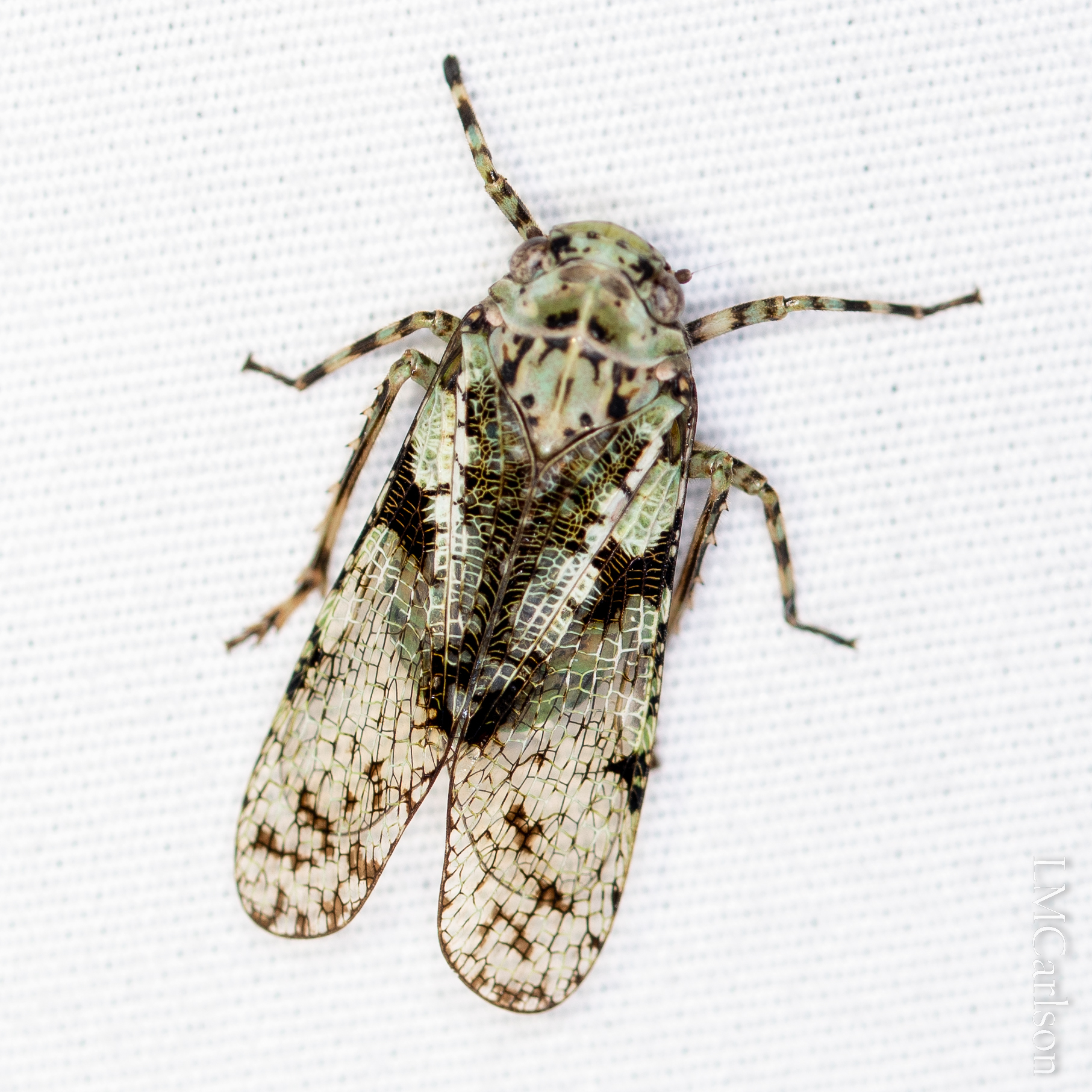
- Scaralina marmorata, North Carolina

Scientific classification
- Domain: Eukaryota
- Kingdom: Animalia
- Phylum: Arthropoda
- Class: Insecta
- Order: Hemiptera
- Suborder: Auchenorrhyncha
- Infraorder: Fulgoromorpha
- Family: Fulgoridae
- Genus: Scaralina
- Species: S. marmorata

Binomial name
- Scaralina marmorata (Spinola, 1839)

Synonyms
- Calyptoproctus marmoratus Spinola, 1839; Crepusia glauca Metcalf, 1923; Alphina glauca (Metcalf, 1923)

= Scaralina marmorata =

Species of planthopper

Scaralina marmorata is a species of planthopper in the family Fulgoridae, found throughout the southeastern United States. It is one of four species (the others being Scaralina aethrinsula, Scaralina cristata, and Scaralina metcalfi) that were, for several decades, erroneously grouped together under a single name, Alphina glauca; this name is now treated as a synonym of S. marmorata.

== Taxonomy ==
Historically, this species has been incorrectly associated with three other genera; the genus Calyptoproctus (which molecular DNA evidence suggests is not in the tribe Poiocerini), the genus Crepusia, a slightly more closely related genus from South America, and Alphina, a closely related genus also from South America.

== Biology ==
Scaralina marmorata is associated with oaks (Quercus spp.). It is the only species in the genus routinely found at elevations below 1000 meters.

== Distribution ==
Scaralina marmorata is found from central Texas up to Oklahoma and across to Virginia, and all areas south and east of this, wherever oaks are found.
