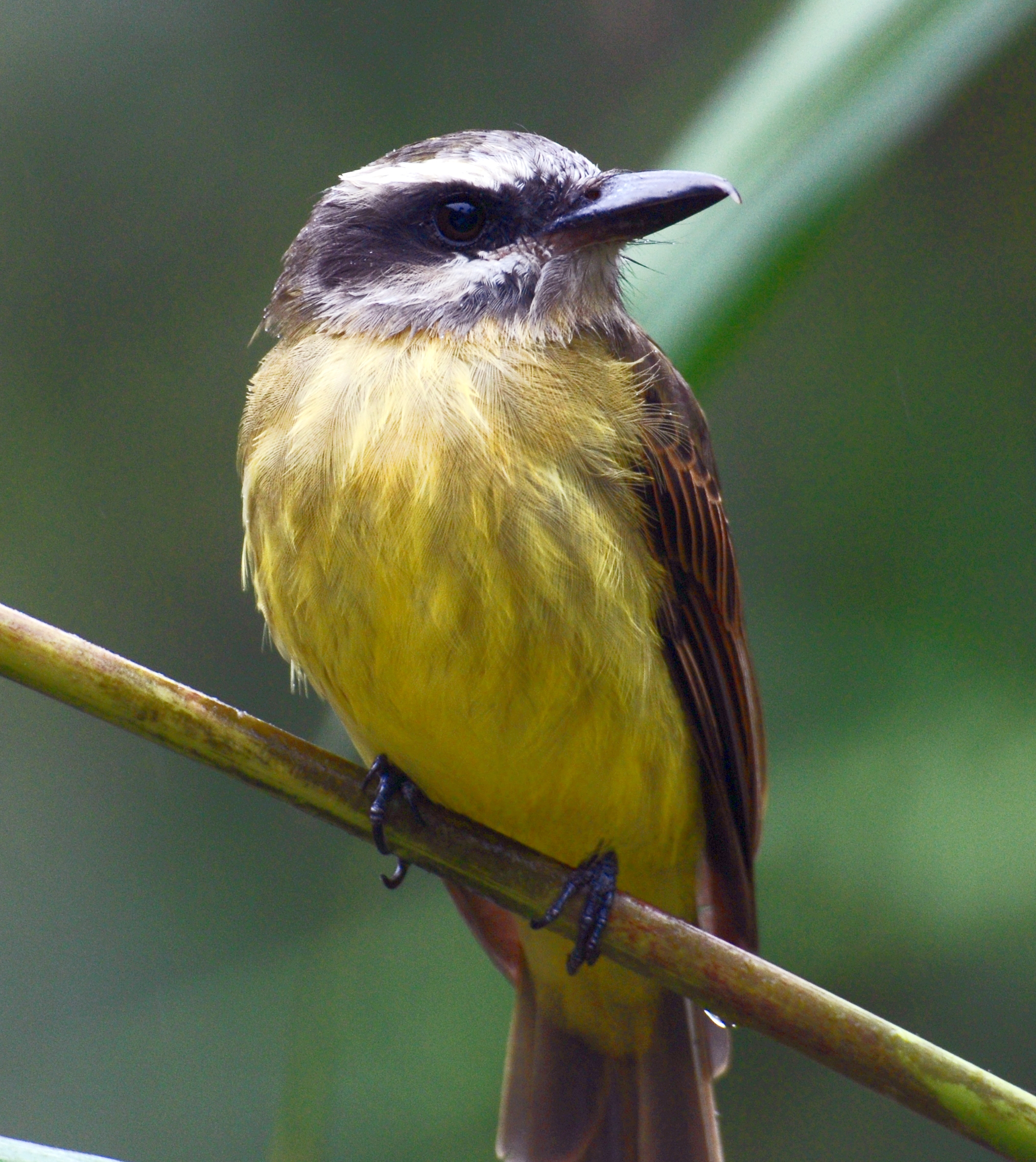

Conservation status
- Least Concern (IUCN 3.1)

Scientific classification
- Kingdom: Animalia
- Phylum: Chordata
- Class: Aves
- Order: Passeriformes
- Family: Tyrannidae
- Genus: Myiodynastes
- Species: M. chrysocephalus

Binomial name
- Myiodynastes chrysocephalus (Tschudi, 1844)

= Golden-crowned flycatcher =

Species of bird

The golden-crowned flycatcher (Myiodynastes chrysocephalus) is a species of bird in the family Tyrannidae, the tyrant flycatchers. It is found in Argentina, Bolivia, and Peru.

== Taxonomy and systematics ==
The golden-crowned flycatcher has a complicated taxonomic history. It was originally described as Scaphorhychus chrysocephalus. By the early 1900s it had been reassigned to genus Myiodynastes, which had been erected in 1847. A 1927 publication assigned it five subspecies. One of them (M. c. intermedius) was soon folded into M. c. cinerascens. By at least 1979 M. c. hemichrysus had been separated to form a new species, the golden-bellied flycatcher. A 2016 publication detailed the vocal differences and similarities between the three remaining subspecies of the golden-crowned flycatcher and the golden-bellied flycatcher. Based on that study, by 2020 BirdLife International's Handbook of the Birds of the World moved two subspecies from the golden-crowned to the golden-bellied. The Clements taxonomy followed suit in 2022 and the IOC and both subcommittees of the American Ornithological Society in 2023. The golden-bellied and golden-crowned flycatchers are sister species.

These changes left the golden-crowned flycatcher a monotypic species.

== Description ==
The golden-crowned flycatcher is 18.5 to 22 cm (7.3 to 8.7 in) long and weighs about 37 to 40 g (1.3 to 1.4 oz). The sexes have the same plumage. Adults have a brownish gray to dusky crown with a usually hidden golden-yellow patch in the center. They have a long white supercilium on an otherwise mostly grayish dusky face. Their upperparts are mostly dull olive with a greenish olive rump and uppertail coverts; the last have cinnamon or buffy edges at their tips. Their wings are dusky with thin rufous to tawny-buff edges on the coverts and flight feathers. Their tail is mostly dusky with some rufous edgers on the feathers. Their chin is white, their throat pale buffy, their breast buffy yellow, and the rest of their underparts pale yellow. Their breast has a cloudy suffusion of pale grayish olive or olive in the center and olive streaks on its sides. The species has a black to dark brown iris, a stout black bill, and blackish legs and feet.

== Distribution and habitat ==
The golden-crowned flycatcher is found on the eastern slope of the Andes from south of the Marañon River in northern Peru's Amazonas Department south through central Bolivia slightly into northwestern Argentina's Salta Province. It inhabits the edges and canopy of foothill and montane forest and woodland and also cloudforest. It especially favors openings in the forest, both human-made and natural as caused by landslides and fallen trees. It also occurs along roads and watercourses. In elevation it ranges between 600 and 2,700 m (2,000 and 8,900 ft) in Peru and 350 and 3,100 m (1,100 and 10,200 ft) in Bolivia.

== Behavior ==
=== Movement ===
The golden-crowned flycatcher is believed to be a year-round resident across its range.

=== Feeding ===
The golden-crowned flycatcher feeds on insects and fruit. It usually forages singly or in pairs and occasionally joins mixed-species feeding flocks but does not follow them. It perches from the forest's lower to mid-levels and takes prey in mid-air by hawking and prey and fruits with short upward sallies to glean it from vegetation or while briefly hovering.

=== Breeding ===
The golden-crowned flycatcher's breeding season includes May in Peru but is otherwise not known. Its nest has not been described but from photographs appears to be similar to that of the golden-bellied flycatcher, which see here. Also from a photograph, its eggs are a slightly glossy creamy white with dark cinnamon flecks, streaks, and blotches. Nothing else is known about the species' breeding biology.

=== Vocalization ===
The golden-crowned flycatcher's dawn song is "a loud, squeaky REE'chewee?" and its call a "metallic, slightly squeaky rew-TCHI?".

== Status ==
The IUCN has assessed the golden-crowned flycatcher as being of Least Concern. Its population size is not known and is believed to be increasing. No immediate threats have been identified. It is considered uncommon to locally fairly common overall but uncommon in Peru. It occurs in several protected areas and "is considered unlikely to become threatened in the near future".
