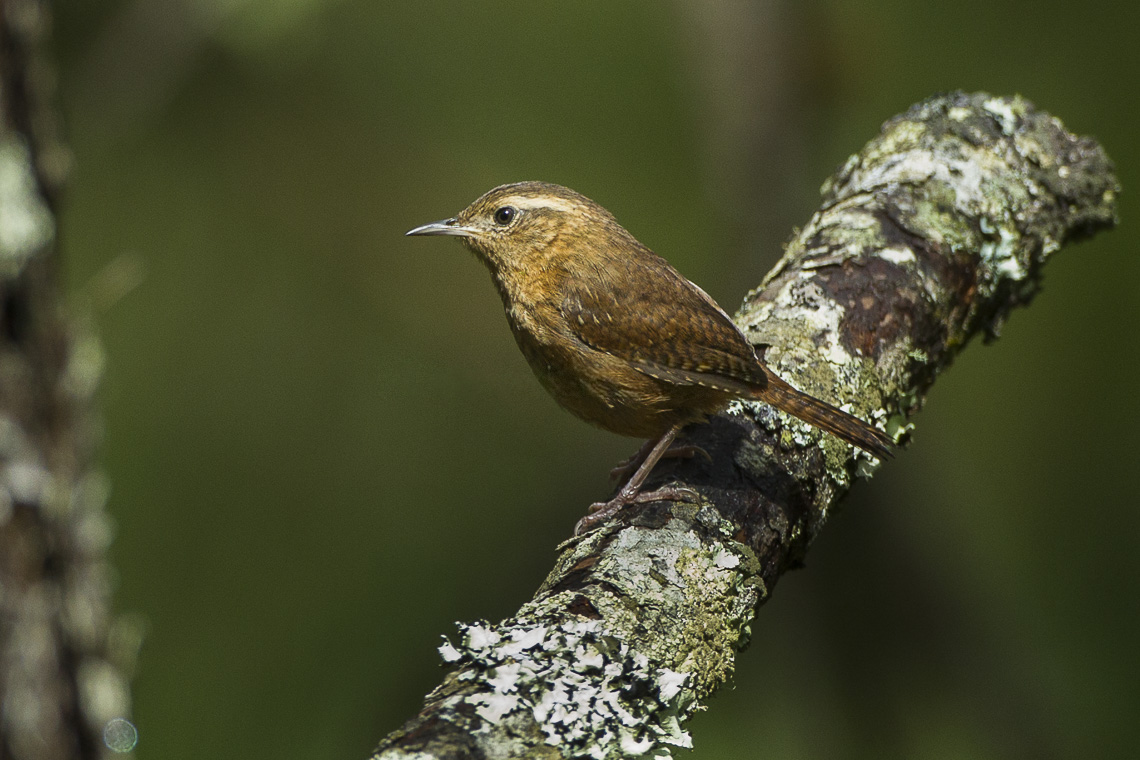

Scientific classification
- Domain: Eukaryota
- Kingdom: Animalia
- Phylum: Chordata
- Class: Aves
- Order: Passeriformes
- Family: Troglodytidae
- Genus: Troglodytes
- Species: T. aedon
- Subspecies: T. a. brunneicollis

Trinomial name
- Troglodytes aedon brunneicollis PL Sclater, 1858

= Brown-throated wren =

Subspecies of bird

The brown-throated wren (Troglodytes aedon brunneicollis) is a mostly Mexican bird in the wren family, often considered a subspecies of the house wren.

== Range and habitat ==
This subspecies is fairly common in some areas, in oak and pine-oak woods and clearings in the highlands of Mexico (1600 m to 3000 m elevation) from Oaxaca north to Coahuila and Sonora and in neighboring southeastern Arizona.

== Description ==
Its appearance is very similar to the house wren's, 11.5 to 12.5 cm (4.5 to 4.7 inches) long, with brown head and upperparts, barred with black on the wings and narrow tail. It has a stronger buff eyebrow stripe and black eyestripe than the house wren. Below it is buffy, grayer (more like the house wren) in subspecies cahooni of northern Mexico and Arizona, more ocher in the other subspecies. The flanks and undertail coverts have dark brown bars.

The voice is also similar to the house wren's. The song consists of "scratchy, chortling, warbling, and trilling" sounds, and there are scolding calls starting with a ch sound, as well as a mewing call. One sound not in the house wren's repertoire is "a bright springy trill, tseeeurr or ssreeuur, suggesting a rock wren."

The brown-throated wren's behavior is, perhaps unsurprisingly, similar to the house wren's: typically skulking but not infrequently visible, especially when singing from an open perch.

== Classification ==
Some authorities do not list the brown-throated wren as a separate species. An argument for lumping it with the house wren is that house wrens in the southwestern United States and northern Mexico have characters intermediate between the two species.

The brown-throated wren is considered a separate species following the Handbook of the Birds of the World. A 2005 DNA study corroborated this split by suggesting that the brown-throated wren was not only a separate species but likely not the house wren's closest relative. For further information, see Troglodytes.

As a separate species, it comprises five subspecies: brunneicollis, cahooni, compositus, nitidus, and vorhiesi.
