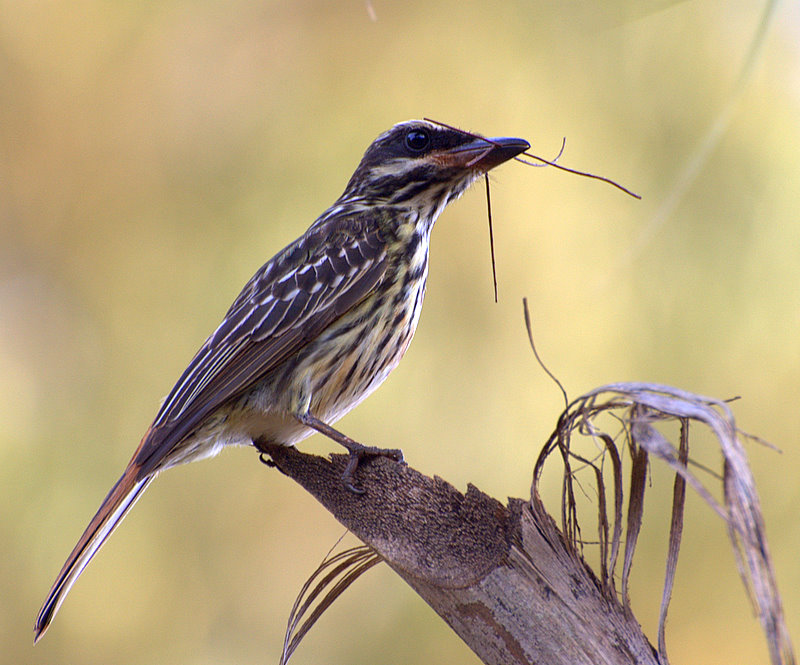
- In Sarutaiá (São Paulo state, Brazil)

Conservation status
- Least Concern (IUCN 3.1)

- Least Concern (IUCN 3.1)

Scientific classification
- Kingdom: Animalia
- Phylum: Chordata
- Class: Aves
- Order: Passeriformes
- Family: Tyrannidae
- Genus: Myiodynastes
- Species: M. maculatus

Binomial name
- Myiodynastes maculatus (Statius Müller, PL, 1776)
- Breeding Year-round Migration

= Streaked flycatcher =

Species of bird

The streaked flycatcher (Myiodynastes maculatus) is a passerine bird in the family Tyrannidae, the tyrant flycatchers. It is found in Mexico, in every South American country except El Salvador, in Trinidad and Tobago, in every mainland South American country (though only as a vagrant to Chile), and as a vagrant to Bonaire.

== Taxonomy and systematics ==
The streaked flycatcher's taxonomy is unsettled. The IOC, the North and South American Classification Committees of the American Ornithological Society, and the Clements taxonomy assign it these seven subspecies:

- m. insolens Ridgway, 1887
- M. m. difficilis Zimmer, JT, 1937
- M. m. nobilis Sclater, PL, 1859
- M. m. chapmani Zimmer, JT, 1937
- M. m. maculatus (Statius Müller, PL, 1776)
- M. m. tobagensis Zimmer, JT, 1937
- M. m. solitarius (Vieillot, 1819)

What is now M. m. solitarius was originally described as a species, Tyrannus solitarius. Though it was later moved to genus Myiodynastes it was treated by many authors as a full species into the twentieth century. By about the middle of the century most taxonomists had reassigned it as a subspecies of M. maculatus. BirdLife International's Handbook of the Birds of the World (HBW) long treated the streaked flycatcher as a single species but beginning in 2016 split M. solitarius as the "southern streaked flycatcher". It calls M. maculatus with other six subspecies the "northern streaked flycatcher". Clements does recognize some partial separation between the two within the single species, calling them respectively the "streaked flycatcher (southern)" and "streaked flycatcher (northern)".

This article follows the single-species, seven-subspecies, model.

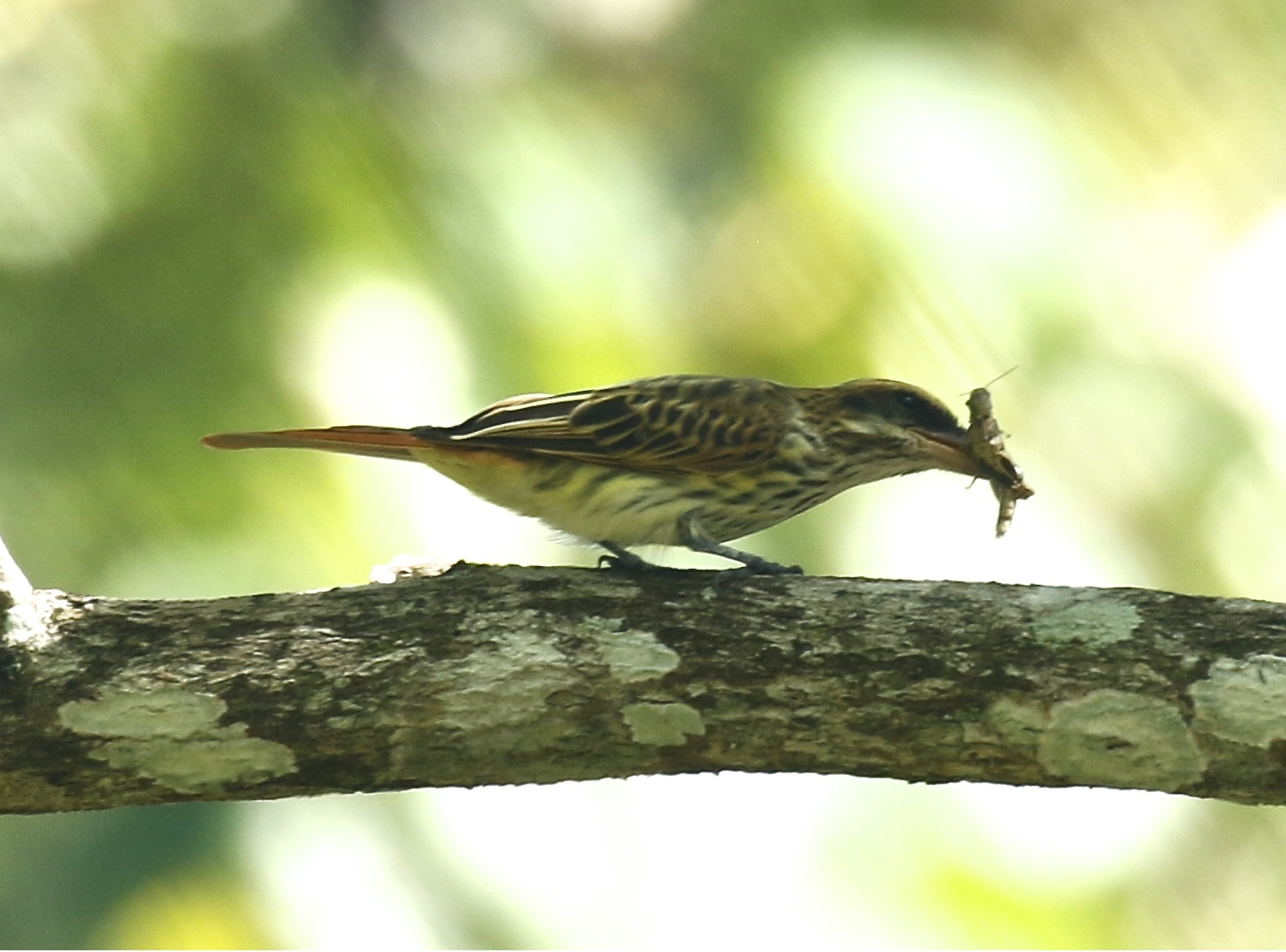
Canopy Camp - Darien, Panama

== Description ==
The streaked flycatcher is 20.5 to 23 cm (8.1 to 9.1 in) long and weighs 36.5 to 50 g (1.3 to 1.8 oz). The sexes have the same plumage. Adults of the nominate subspecies M. m. maculatus have an olive to olive-brown crown and nape with thin cinnamon edges on the feathers and a large, partially hidden, bright yellow to orange-yellow patch in the center of the crown. They have black lores; the color extends to the ear coverts and forms a dark "mask". They have a dull white to yellowish white rather blurry supercilium and a white streak below the mask. Their upperparts to the upper rump are grayish brown to olive with buffy edges and dusky shafts on the feathers that give a streaked appearance. Their lower rump and uppertail coverts are cinnamon-rufous with black or dusky streaks. Their wings are dusky with pale cinnamon-rufous edges on the lesser coverts and thin cinnamon-rufous edges on the outer webs of the other coverts and most of the flight feathers. Their tail is mostly cinnamon-rufous with dusky to black along the shafts that shows as streaks. Their chin and underparts are mostly white with yellowish flanks, lower belly, and undertail coverts. Their throat has thin dusky streaks and the breast and flanks have heavier streaks. Juveniles lack the adult's crown patch and have more rufous on the tail feathers.

The other subspecies of the streaked flycatcher differ from the nominate and each other thus:

- m. insolens: more olivaceous upperparts with thinner streaks, a more yellowish supercilium, and thinner streaks on the wings and underparts
- M. m. difficilis: paler overall with a buff crown and hindneck and buffy edges on the upperparts' dark streaks
- M. m. nobilis: paler and buffier upperparts with more of a yellow wash and less heavy streaks on the underparts
- M. m. chapmani: similar to nobilis but with a wide and distinct supercilium and slightly heavier underparts streaks
- M. m. tobagensis: wide pale edges on the head and upperpart feathers, a warmer yellow belly, and heavier streaks on the breast and flanks
- M. m. solitarius: much less rufous overall than the others with much wider blackish streaking throughout; the crown and tail appear almost fully black

All subspecies have a brown to dark brown iris, a black bill with a pinkish to pinkish brown base to the mandible, and gray to black legs and feet.

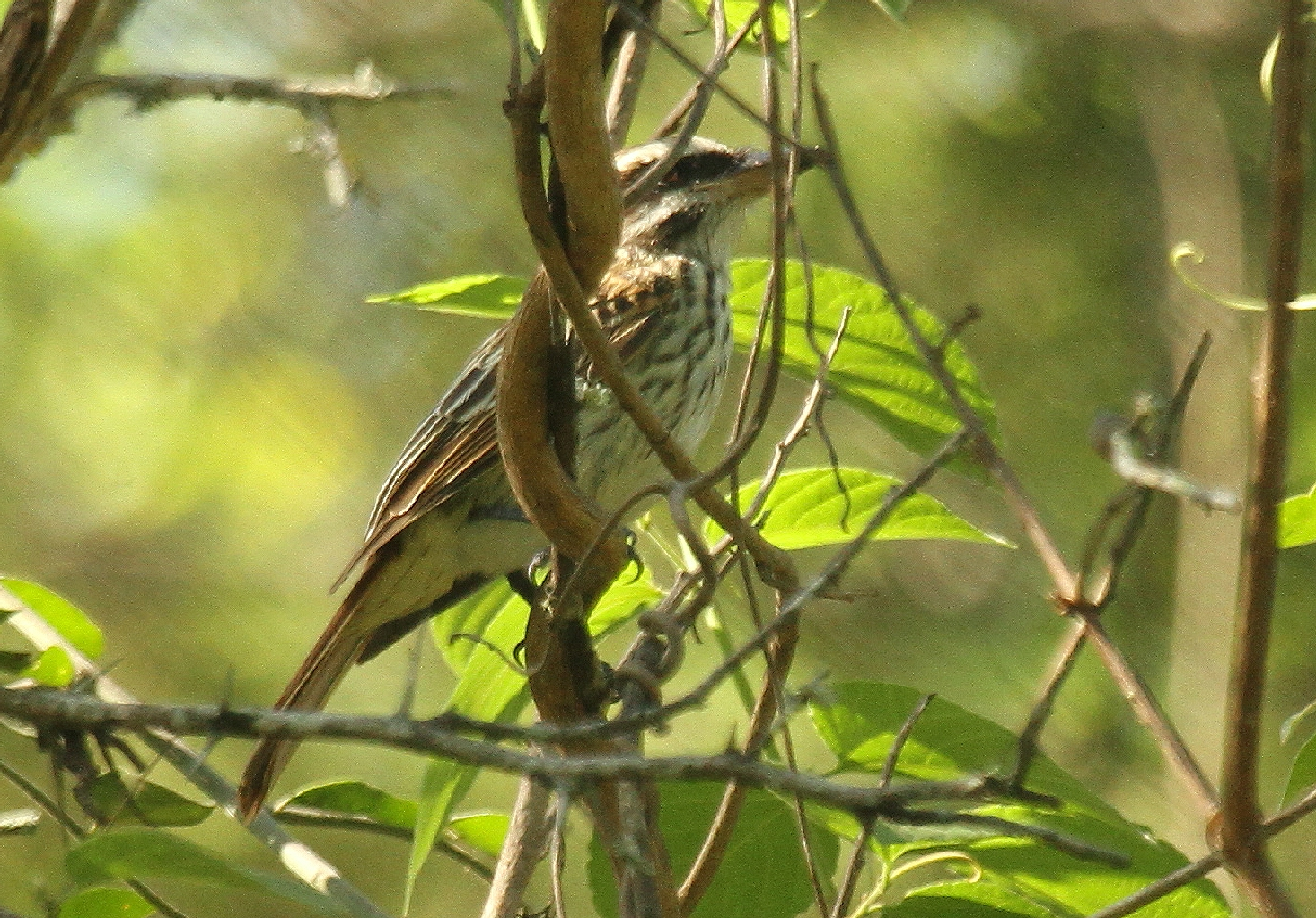
Jorupe Preserve - Ecuador

== Distribution and habitat ==
The subspecies of the streaked flycatcher are found thus:

- m. insolens: Gulf-Caribbean slope from southern Tamaulipas in Mexico south, including the southern Yucatán Peninsula, through Belize, northern Guatemala, and northwestern Honduras into northern Nicaragua; in migration to Colombia
- M. m. difficilis: southwestern Nicaragua south through western Costa Rica, through Panama including offshore islands, and across central Colombia into western Venezuela through Zulia and Táchira to Portuguesa
- M. m. nobilis: across Colombia from northern Córdoba Department including the Sierra Nevada de Santa Marta into the western Serranía del Perijá
- M. m. chapmani: from Chocó Department in western Colombia south through western Ecuador into extreme northwestern Peru's Piura Department
- M. m. maculatus: Suriname, French Guiana, northern Brazil north of the Amazon from the upper Negro River east to northwestern Maranhão
- M. m. tobagensis: Venezuela except the west, Venezuela's Margarita Island, Trinidad, Tobago, and Guyana
- M. m. solitarius: eastern Peru east across Brazil and south from there through eastern Bolivia, Paraguay and Uruguay into Argentina as far as La Pampa and northwestern Buenos Aires provinces; in migration as far as northern South America

The species has also occurred as a vagrant on Bonaire and in Chile.

The streaked flycatcher inhabits the canopy and edges of a variety of forested landscapes in the tropical and lower subtropical zones. These include evergreen and deciduous forest, gallery forest, várzea forest, mangroves, and, within the forest, clearings with some tall trees. In Mexico and Central America it ranges overall from sea level to 1,750 m (5,700 ft) though mostly below 1,500 m (4,900 ft) in northern Central America and to 1,200 m (3,900 ft) in Costa Rica. In Colombia and Venezuela it ranges from sea level to 2,000 m (6,600 ft), in Brazil to 1,500 m (4,900 ft), in Ecuador to 1,000 m (3,300 ft), and in Peru it reaches 2,000 m (6,600 ft). It reaches 1,350 m (4,400 ft) in Argentina and 2,100 m (6,900 ft) in Bolivia.

== Behavior ==
=== Movement ===
The streaked flycatcher is a partial migrant. Subspecies M. m. insolens almost entirely vacates the area from Mexico to western Honduras to winter further south through eastern Nicaragua to Costa Rica, Panama, Colombia, and possibly northwestern Ecuador. M. m. solitarius leaves southern Bolivia, Paraguay, far southern Brazil, Uruguay, and Argentina to spend the austral winter in Peru, eastern Ecuador, much of Brazil, and thinly in southern Venezuela. These subspecies' wintering ranges overlap the ranges of the non-migratory subspecies M. m. difficilis, M. m. nobilis, M. m. maculatus, and M. m. tobagensis. Though the species is generally found singly or in pairs it "sometimes joins in loose flocks during migration".

=== Feeding ===
The streaked flycatcher feeds mostly on insects including large cicadas, locusts, and beetles. Its diet also includes berries and other fruits and there are records of it feeding on small lizards. It typically forages singly or in pairs and occasionally joins mixed-species feeding flocks. The migrants from southern South America eat a higher proportion of fruit than resident subspecies. The species forages mostly from the forest's mid-level to the canopy, and catches most insect prey in mid-air with short sallies from a perch. It also takes insects while briefly hovering or after a short glide, and takes fruit by gleaning while perched and while hovering.

=== Breeding ===
The streaked flycatcher's breeding season varies greatly among the subspecies. The northernmost subspecies M. m. insolens breeds in at least May and June. M. m. difficilis breeds from December to August in the north and March to July in Colombia. The southern M. m. solitarius breeds between September and January. The species' nest is a cup or bowl made from somewhat coarse plant fibers and lined with finer ones; the female alone constructs it. It is usually placed in a cavity in a tree, either natural or one made by a woodpecker. In the latter the female usually adds much material to the cavity's bottom to raise the nest. Nests have also been found in bromeliad masses, in an opening in vine tangles, in nest boxes, under the eaves of human structures, and extremely rarely in the open on a branch. The clutch is usually two or three eggs though four-egg clutches are known. The eggs are white or creamy with reddish brown spots. Females incubate the clutch for 15 to 17 days. Fledging occurs 17 to 21 days after hatch and both parents provision the nestlings. Shiny cowbirds (Molothrus bonariensis) are a brood parasite.

=== Vocalization ===
The dawn song of northern populations of the streaked flycatcher has variously been described as "cheer-o-wee-wee, right-here-to-me, kawe-teedly-wink, wheeé-cheederee-wheeé, or as a rising note followed by a short musical chatter: reEET-chewlew'put". That of the southern population is "a squeaky reEET tiWICHu'whit", During the day northern birds make "a sharp, nasal, slightly woodpecker-like behnk or penk!,...a sharp, dry dik or chek [and] a dry, nasal chuk-yi chuk-yi or tsu-ka' tsu-ka, [and] a dry tek and excited squeaky chatters". The species also makes a variety of calls that differ somewhat between the populations.

== Status ==
The IUCN follows HBW taxonomy and so has separately assessed the "northern" and "southern" streaked flycatchers. Both have very large ranges. Their population sizes are not known but are believed to be stable. No immediate threats to either have been identified. The species is considered a "transient and uncommon breeding resident" in northern Central America. In Costa Rica it is fairly common in the lowlands on the Pacific side, less common at higher elevations there, and casual on the Caribbean side. It is considered common in Colombia, a fairly common resident in Venezuela, common in Ecuador, a fairly common resident and common austral migrant in Peru, and common in Brazil. The species is "[a]daptable; found in many types of wooded habitat, and is not dependent on intact forest; [it] survives well in degraded habitats and is tolerant of human presence".
