= Madrean Sky Islands =

Peak-isolated biomes in Arizona, New Mexico, and Mexico

Madrean Sky Islands montane forests
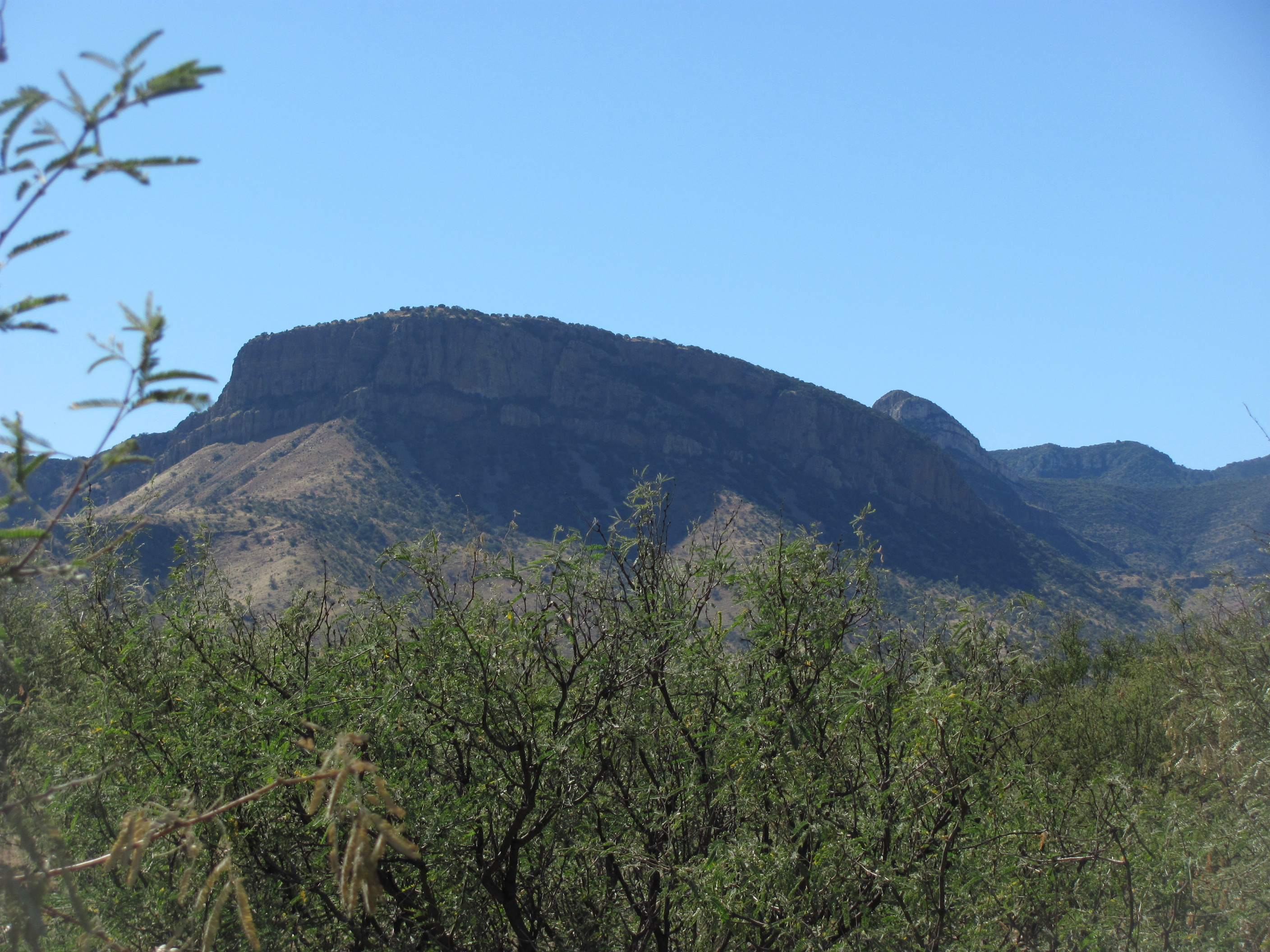
- Apache Peak in the Whetstone Mountains, as seen from the Kartchner Caverns State Park

- Madrean Sky Islands montane forests ecoregion

Ecology
- Biome: Temperate broadleaf and mixed forest

Geography
- Countries: Mexico; United States
- States: Arizona; Chihuahua; New Mexico

Conservation
- Conservation status: Critical/Endangered

The Madrean Sky Islands are enclaves of Madrean pine–oak woodlands, found at higher elevations in a complex of small mountain ranges in southern and southeastern Arizona, southwestern New Mexico, and northwestern Mexico. The region is characterized by its high levels of biodiversity, being home to over 7,000 different species of plants and animals. The sky islands are surrounded at lower elevations by the arid Sonoran and Chihuahuan deserts, offering a remarkable environmental contrast to the surrounding grasslands, woodlands and forests as elevation increases. The northern west–east perimeter of the sky island region merges into the higher elevation eastern Mogollon Rim and the White Mountains of eastern Arizona (southern Anasazi region).

The Sky Islands are the northernmost of the Madrean pine–oak woodlands, and are classified as part of the Sierra Madre Occidental pine–oak forests ecoregion, of the tropical and subtropical coniferous forests biome. The Sky Islands were isolated from one another and from the pine–oak woodlands of the Sierra Madre Occidental to the south by the warming and drying of the climate since the ice ages.

There are approximately 27 Madrean Sky Islands in the United States, and 15 in northern Mexico. The major Madrean Sky Island ranges in Arizona are the Baboquivari Mountains, Chiricahua Mountains, Huachuca Mountains, Pinaleño Mountains, Santa Catalina Mountains, Santa Rita Mountains and Whetstone Mountains. The major Madrean Sky Island ranges in New Mexico are the Peloncillo Mountains and Animas Mountains. Similar ranges in Texas include the Guadalupe Mountains, Davis Mountains and Chisos Mountains in the Trans-Pecos region.

Significant urban areas located very close to the Madrean Sky Islands include Las Cruces, New Mexico, and Tucson, Arizona.

== Fauna ==
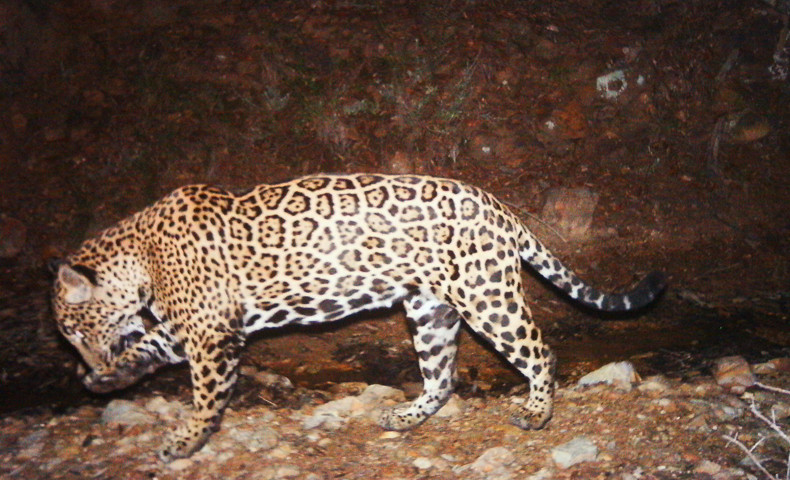
El Jefe in Arizona, 2013.

Though formerly extirpated from the United States, the North American jaguar has returned to the area from northern Mexico in small numbers. One such jaguar is named El Jefe.

== See also ==
- Madrean Region
- List of birds of the Madrean Sky Islands
- List of Madrean Sky Island mountain ranges – Sonoran – Chihuahuan Deserts
- Malpai Borderlands

== Climate Change ==
The biodiversity in the Madrean Sky Islands is at high risk due to temperature elevations from climate change. Between 15 to 20% of reptile and mammal diversity is predicted to be lost by the year 2100 if climate trends continue.
