= Strawberry Schoolhouse =

- Strawberry School
- U.S. National Register of Historic Places
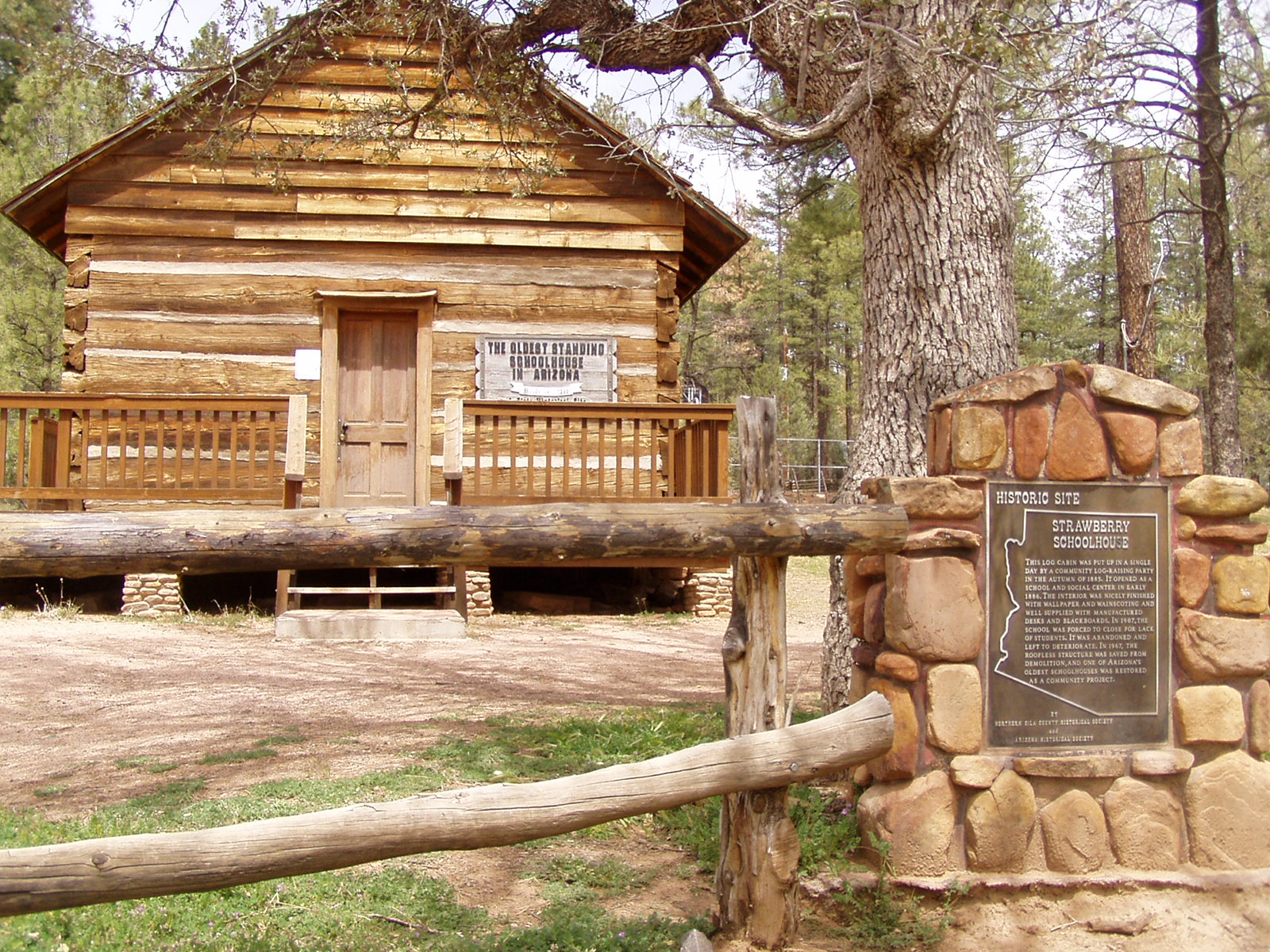
- The Strawberry Schoolhouse and historical marker.

- Location within Arizona
- Location: 9318 Fossil Creek Road, Strawberry, Arizona, USA
- Coordinates: 34°24′20.94″N 111°31′10.07″W
- Built: Fall 1885
- NRHP reference No.: 05000422
- Added to NRHP: May 10, 2005

The Strawberry Schoolhouse is a historic one-room school building located in northwestern Gila County, Arizona, in the small mountain community of Strawberry. Built of pine logs in 1885, the Strawberry Schoolhouse is reputed to be the "oldest standing schoolhouse in Arizona" and now functions as a fully restored local history museum, complete with a late-19th century classroom exhibit.

The Strawberry School was formally dedicated as a Historical Monument on August 15, 1981, and was added to the National Register of Historic Places on May 10, 2005. It is often called the "oldest standing schoolhouse" remaining in Arizona, but is closely outdated by the Arivaca Schoolhouse in Arivaca, Arizona, which was built six years earlier in 1879.

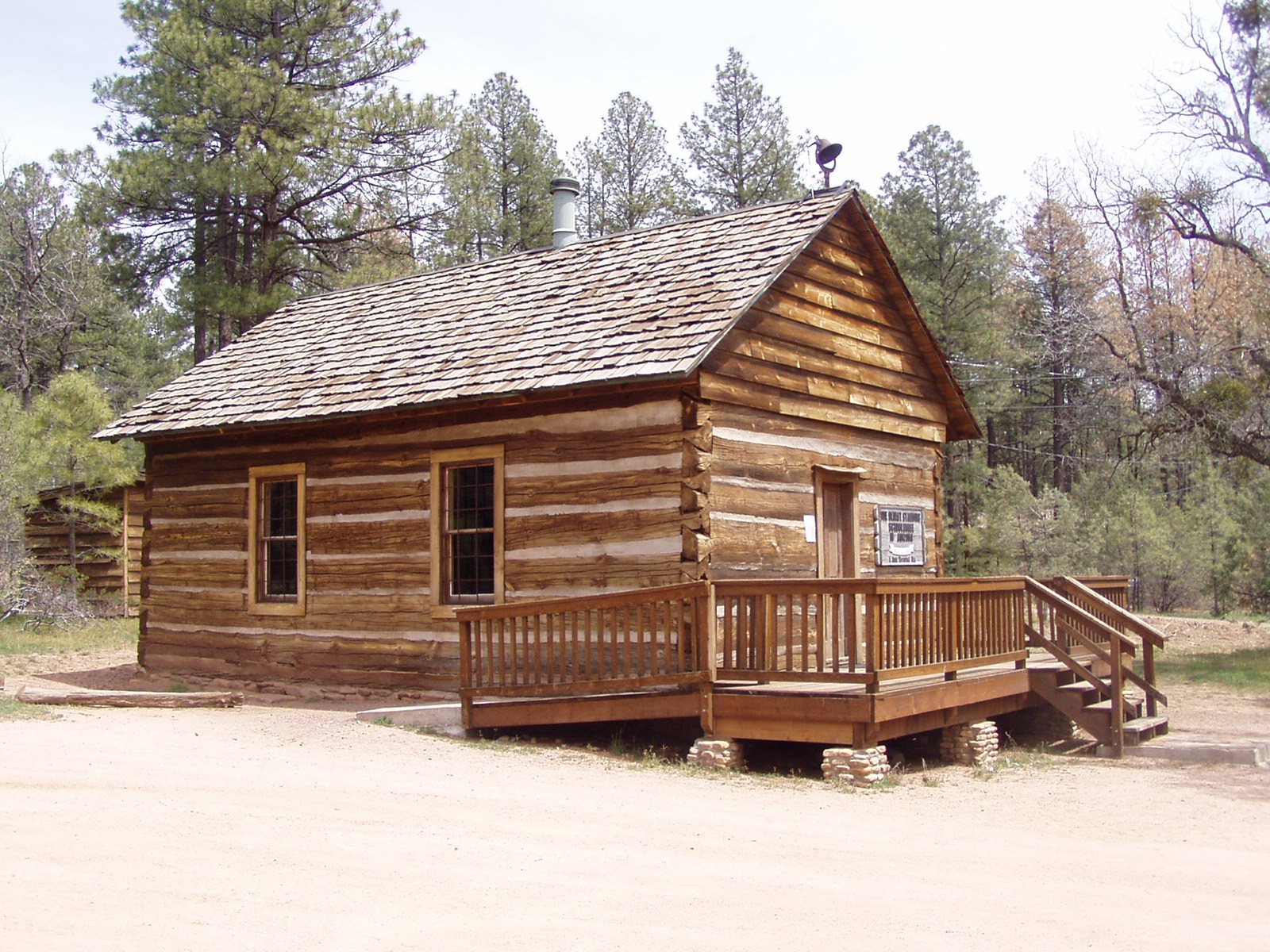
The Strawberry Schoolhouse in 2003.

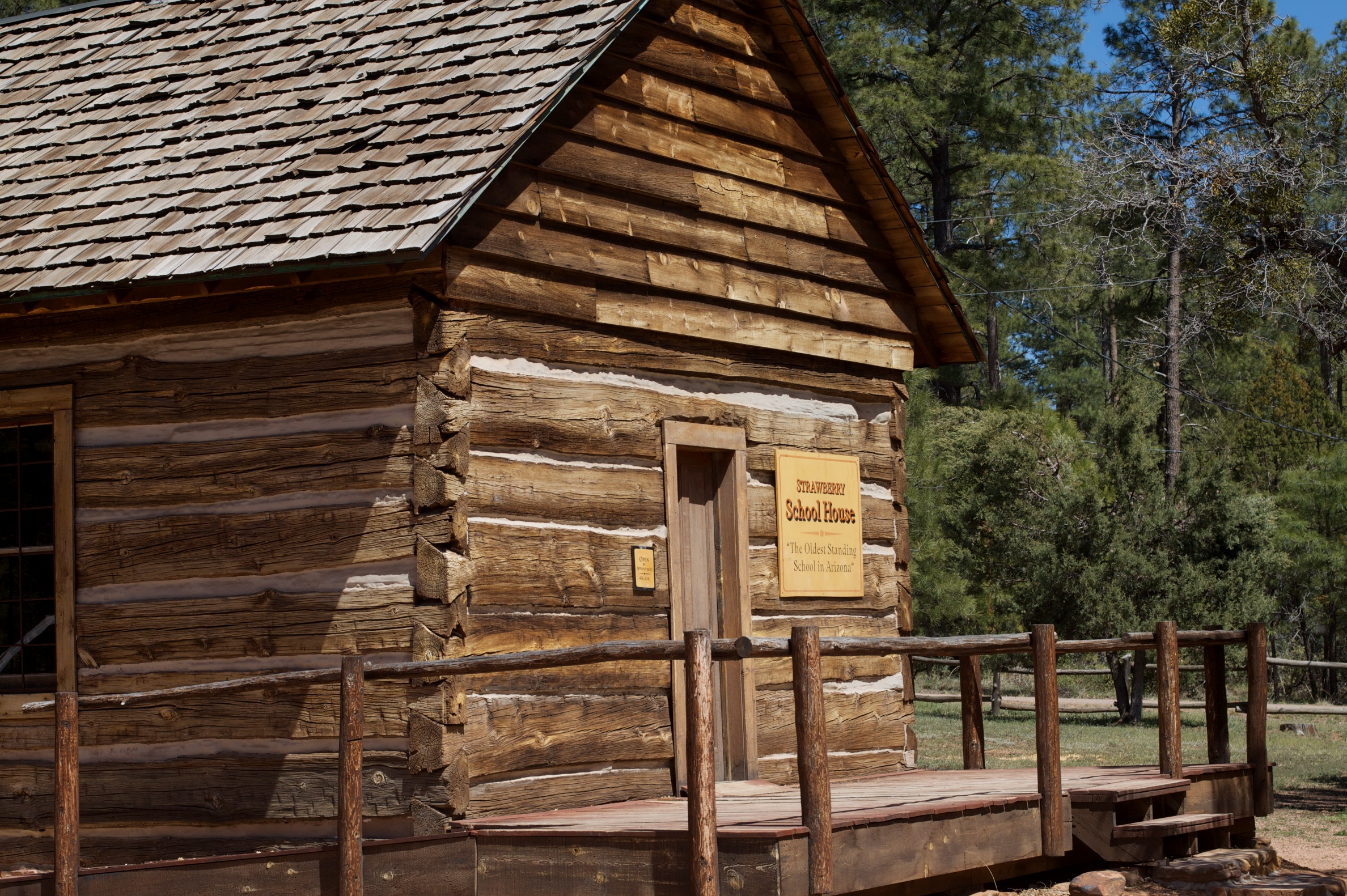
The front of the building.

== See also ==
- National Register of Historic Places in Gila County, Arizona
