= Arivaca Schoolhouse =

- U.S. National Register of Historic Places
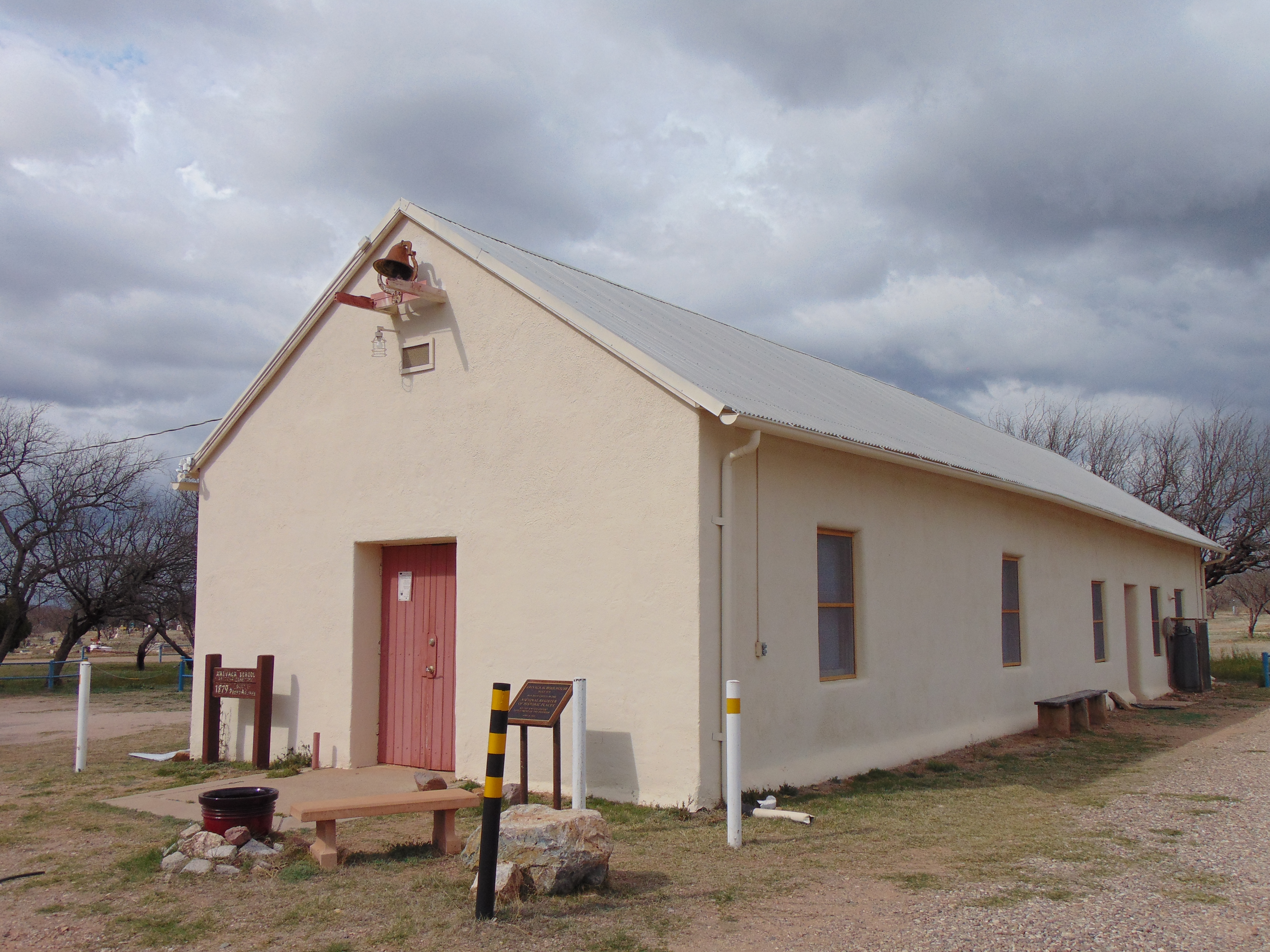
- The Arivaca Schoolhouse in 2015.

- Location within Arizona Location within the United States
- Location: 17180 West 4th Street, Arivaca, Arizona, USA
- Coordinates: 31°34′33.97″N 111°19′48.17″W
- Built: 1879
- Architectural style: Rectangular one-room schoolhouse
- NRHP reference No.: 12000199
- Added to NRHP: April 16, 2012

The Arivaca Schoolhouse is a historic one-room school building located in the unincorporated community of Arivaca, in southern Pima County, Arizona. A small and simple structure made of locally manufactured mud adobe bricks, the Arivaca Schoolhouse was built in 1879 and is the oldest standing schoolhouse remaining in Arizona. It was added to the National Register of Historic Places on April 16, 2012, and is now used as a center for community activities.

The Arivaca Schoolhouse was built by Don Pedro Aguirre, an Arizona pioneer that had come to the United States from his native Chihuahua, Mexico, in the 1850s. The school was run by School District No. 2, Pima County. In 1868, Aguirre opened a stagecoach stop for his freighting business near Arivaca and eventually became one of the leading citizens of the community during its period of development in the 1870s. In 1879, Aquirre built the Arivaca Schoolhouse for his own children and those of his employees, at his own expense. The building is a simple one-room rectangular structure with a stone foundation, stuccoed adobe walls and a wooden roof covered in tin. The Arivaca School District was established on April 8, 1879.

The schoolhouse was in use for over seventy years from its construction in 1879 to its closing in 1953.

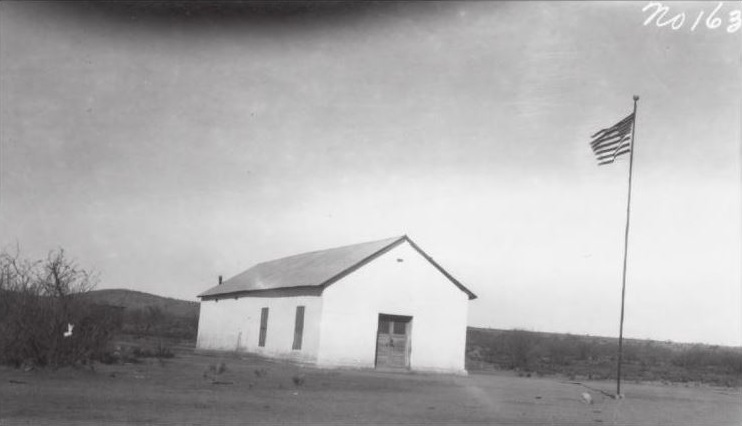
An early photograph of Arivaca Schoolhouse.

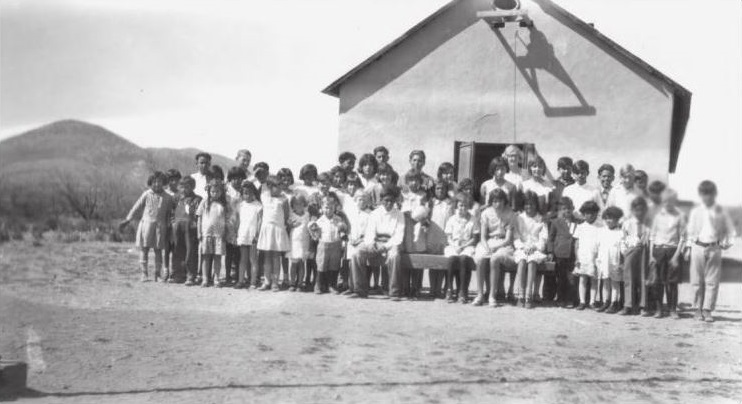
The teacher and her students in front of the schoolhouse in the 1930s.

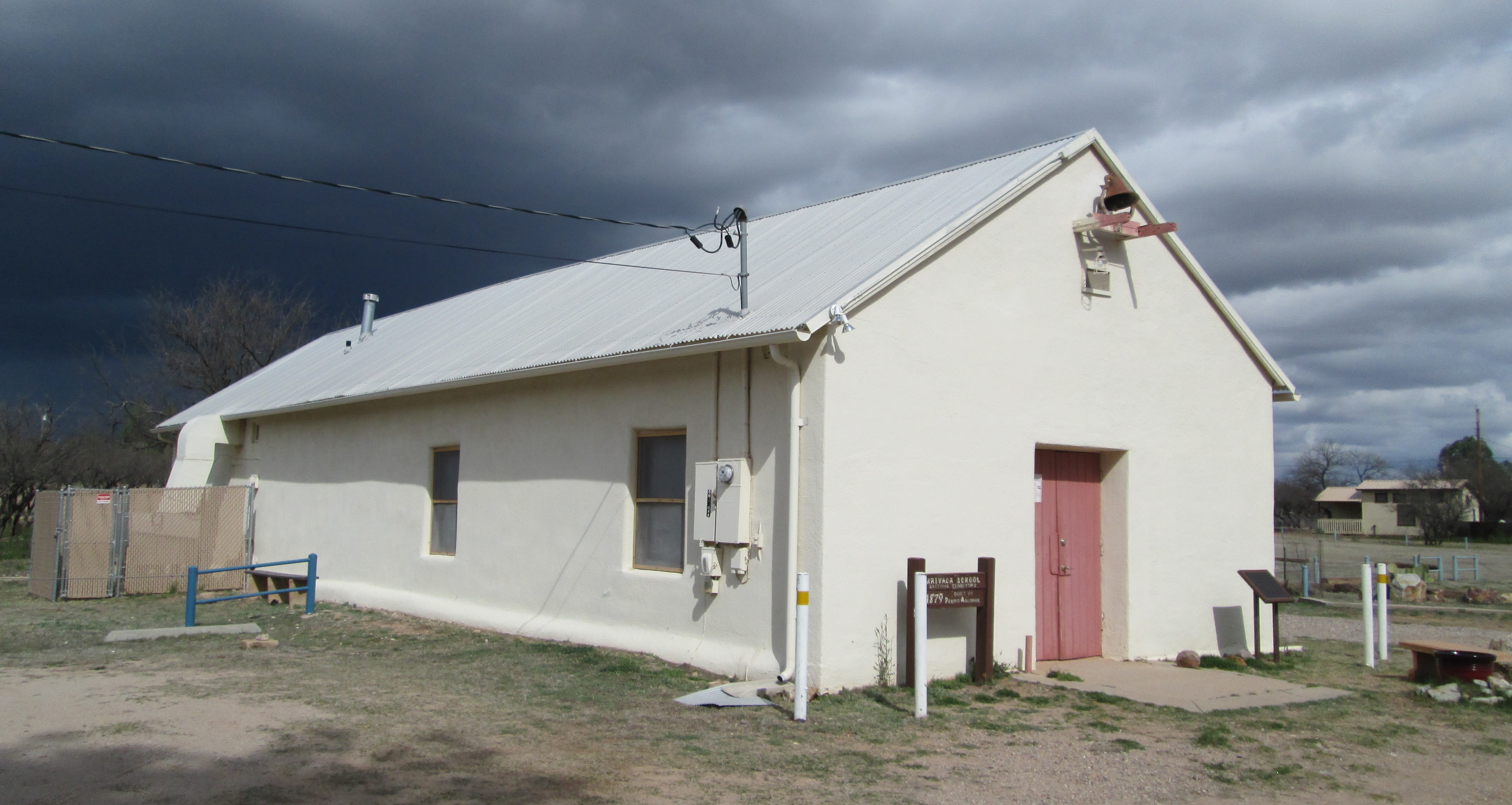
The historic schoolhouse is now the centerpiece of the Arivaca Schoolhouse Park.

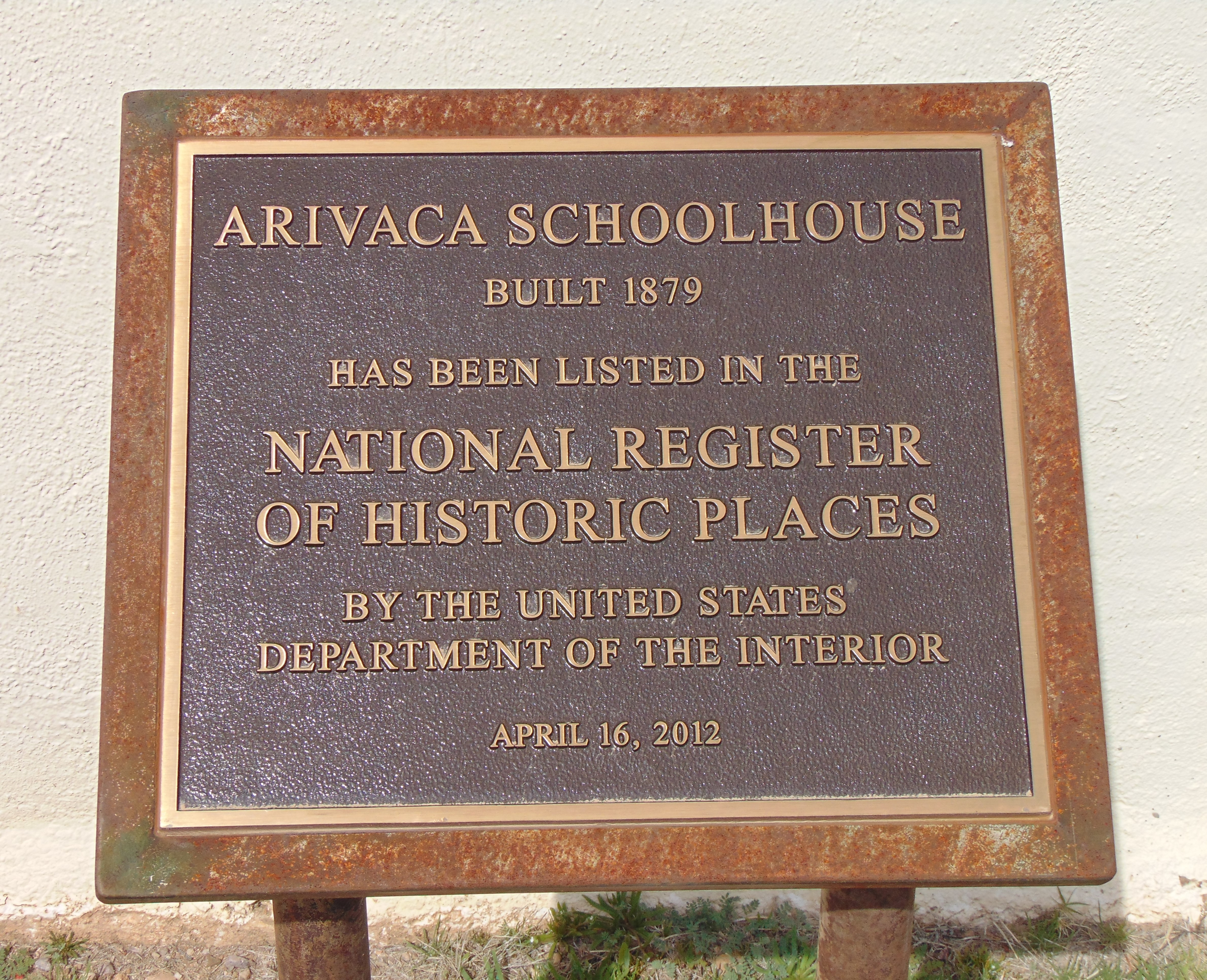
The National Register of Historic Places marker at the front of the schoolhouse.

== See also ==
- Strawberry Schoolhouse
- National Register of Historic Places listings in Pima County, Arizona
